As of September 2016, the International Union for Conservation of Nature (IUCN) lists 6645 least concern plant species. 30% of all evaluated plant species are listed as least concern. 
The IUCN also lists 131 subspecies and 118 varieties as least concern. No subpopulations of plants have been evaluated by the IUCN.

This is a complete list of least concern plant species, subspecies and varieties evaluated by the IUCN.

Algae

Chara hydropitys
Nitella flexilis, stonewort
Nitella mucronata
Nitella myriotricha
Nitella oligospira
Nitella pseudoflabellata
Nitella tenuissima
Nitella terrestris
Ochtodes crokeri
Pachymenia saxicola
Pleonosporium complanatum
Pugetia latiloba

Bryophytes
There are 14 bryophyte species assessed as least concern.

Mosses

Hymenostylium gracillimum
Orthotrichum scanicum
Wardia hygrometrica

Liverworts

Cheilolejeunea cedercreutzii
Cololejeunea azorica
Frullania polysticta
Herbertus borealis
Lepidozia azorica
Leptoscyphus azoricus
Luteolejeunea herzogii
Marsupella profunda
Plagiochila fuscolutea
Sauteria spongiosa
Stenorrhipis rhizomatica

Pteridophytes
There are 113 species, three subspecies, and one variety of pteridophyte assessed as least concern.

Leptosporangiate ferns
There are 78 species, three subspecies, and one variety in the class Polypodiopsida assessed as least concern.

Polypodiales

Species

Acrostichum aureum, golden leather fern
Acrostichum danaeifolium
Acrostichum speciosum
Adiantum capillus-veneris, maidenhair fern
Aspidium ochthodes
Asplenium aequibasis
Asplenium formosum, showy spleenwort
Athyrium medium
Athyrium solenopteris
Blotiella stipitata
Bolbitis appendiculata
Bolbitis presiliana
Bolbitis semicordata
Bolbitis subcrenata
Ceratopteris cornuta
Ceratopteris thalictroides
Cyclosorus ciliatus
Cyclosorus interruptus, Hottentot fern
Didymochlaena truncatula
Diplazium chimborazense
Diplazium esculentum
Diplazium filamentosum, black-scale fern
Dryopteris corleyi, Costa Verde male-fern
Elaphoglossum beddomei
Elaphoglossum nilgiricum
Elaphoglossum stelligerum
Lellingeria rupestris
Leptochilus decurrens
Lindsaea kirkii
Lorinseria areolata
Microlepia trapeziformis
Microsorum pteropus
Onoclea sensibilis
Onoclea struthiopteris, ostrich fern
Oreogrammitis pilifera
Polypodium mindense
Polypodium segregatum
Polypodium tridens
Pseudophegopteris dianae, brown-scale fern
Pseudophegopteris pyrrhorachis
Pteris barkleyae
Pteris paleacea, lays-back fern
Pteris usambarensis
Pteris vittata, ladder brake
Thelypteris palustris, marsh fern
Thelypteris semilunata
Thelypteris tetragona, freetip maiden fern
Thelypteris xylodes
Woodwardia virginica

Subspecies

Pteris albersii subsp. mufindiensis
Pteris albersii subsp. uaraguessensis
Thelypteris tetragona subsp. aberrans

Varieties
Asplenium formosum var. carolinum

Hymenophyllales

Crepidomanes intramarginale
Crepidomanes maximum
Trichomanes angustatum
Trichomanes speciosum, Killarney fern

Cyatheales

Alsophila nilgirensis
Cyathea humilis
Cyathea parksiae, rough tree-fern

Salviniales

Azolla microphylla
Azolla nilotica
Azolla pinnata, ferny azolla
Marsilea aegyptiaca, Egyptian water-clover
Marsilea apposita
Marsilea berhautii
Marsilea burchellii
Marsilea coromandelina
Marsilea crenata
Marsilea ephippiocarpa
Marsilea fenestrata
Marsilea minuta, dwarf water clover
Marsilea quadrifolia, water shamrock
Marsilea unicornis
Marsilea vera
Marsilea villifolia
Salvinia cucullata, Asian watermoss
Salvinia natans, floating fern

Schizaeales
Lygodium microphyllum
Schizaea pusilla

Osmundales
Osmunda hugeliana
Osmunda regalis, royal fern

Isoetopsida

Isoetes alstonii
Isoetes bischlerae
Isoetes bolanderi
Isoetes boliviensis
Isoetes cleefii
Isoetes coromandelina
Isoetes echinospora, spring quillwort
Isoetes engelmannii
Isoetes giessii
Isoetes howellii
Isoetes lacustris, common quillwort
Isoetes lechleri
Isoetes maritima
Isoetes nuttallii
Isoetes palmeri
Isoetes riparia
Isoetes toximontana
Isoetes tuckermanii
Isoetes welwitschii

Lycopodiopsida

Huperzia cumingii
Huperzia dacrydioides
Lycopodiella appressa
Lycopodiella inundata, marsh clubmoss
Selaginella balansae
Selaginella denticulata, toothed-leaved clubmoss

Psilotopsida

Ophioglossum lusitanicum, least adder's-tongue
Ophioglossum nudicaule
Ophioglossum reticulatum

Horsetails

Equisetum arvense, field horsetail
Equisetum fluviatile, water horsetail
Equisetum giganteum, southern giant horsetail
Equisetum hyemale, rough horsetail
Equisetum palustre, marsh horsetail
Equisetum scirpoides, delicate horsetail
Equisetum telmateia, great horsetail

Gymnosperms
There are 419 species, 34 subspecies, and 66 varieties of gymnosperm assessed as least concern.

Cycads

Species

Bowenia serrulata, Byfield fern
Bowenia spectabilis
Cycas angulata
Cycas arnhemica
Cycas basaltica
Cycas calcicola
Cycas canalis
Cycas clivicola
Cycas furfuracea
Cycas lane-poolei
Cycas maconochiei
Cycas media
Cycas orientis
Cycas pruinosa
Cycas revoluta, fern palm
Cycas thouarsii, Madagascar cycad
Cycas xipholepis
Dioon mejiae
Encephalartos cycadifolius, Winterberg cycad
Encephalartos poggei, Kananga cycad
Encephalartos tegulaneus, Kenyan giant cycad
Encephalartos transvenosus, Modjadji cycad
Encephalartos turneri, Turner's cycad
Encephalartos villosus, poor man's cycad
Lepidozamia hopei
Lepidozamia peroffskyana
Macrozamia communis
Macrozamia concinna, Nundle cycad
Macrozamia diplomera
Macrozamia douglasii
Macrozamia dyeri
Macrozamia fearnsidei
Macrozamia fraseri
Macrozamia glaucophylla
Macrozamia heteromera
Macrozamia johnsonii
Macrozamia lucida
Macrozamia macdonnellii
Macrozamia macleayi
Macrozamia miquelii
Macrozamia montana
Macrozamia mountperriensis
Macrozamia polymorpha
Macrozamia reducta
Macrozamia riedlei

Subspecies

Cycas arnhemica subsp. arnhemica
Cycas arnhemica subsp. muninga
Cycas arnhemica subsp. natja
Cycas clivicola subsp. clivicola
Cycas clivicola subsp. lutea
Cycas maconochiei subsp. lanata
Cycas maconochiei subsp. viridis
Cycas media subsp. banksii
Cycas media subsp. ensata
Cycas media subsp. media
Encephalartos tegulaneus subsp. tegulaneus

Conifers

Species

Abies alba, silver fir
Abies amabilis, Pacific silver fir
Abies balsamea, balsam fir
Abies cephalonica, Greek fir
Abies chensiensis, Shensi fir
Abies concolor, white fir
Abies delavayi, Delavay's fir
Abies densa, Sikkim fir
Abies durangensis, Durango fir
Abies fargesii, Farges' fir
Abies firma, Momi fir
Abies forrestii, Forrest's fir
Abies grandis, grand fir
Abies lasiocarpa, subalpine fir
Abies magnifica, red fir
Abies mariesii, Marie's fir
Abies nephrolepis, Hinggan fir
Abies nordmanniana, Caucasian fir
Abies pindrow, pindrow fir
Abies procera, noble fir
Abies religiosa, sacred fir
Abies sachalinensis, Sakhalin fir
Abies sibirica, Siberian fir
Abies veitchii, Veitch's fir
Actinostrobus arenarius, Bruce cypress
Actinostrobus pyramidalis, Swan River cypress
Afrocarpus falcatus, bastard yellowwood
Afrocarpus gracilior, East African yellowwood
Agathis robusta, Queensland kauri pine
Araucaria bidwillii, Bunya pine
Araucaria columnaris, Cook's pine
Araucaria cunninghamii, hoop pine
Callitris canescens, Morrison's cypress pine
Callitris columellaris, white cypress-pine
Callitris endlicheri, black cypress-pine
Callitris macleayana, stringybark pine
Callitris muelleri, Illawarra cypress-pine
Callitris preissii, Rottnest Island pine
Callitris rhomboidea, Port Jackson pine
Callitris verrucosa, scrub cypress-pine
Calocedrus decurrens, incense cedar
Cedrus deodara, deodar cedar
Cephalotaxus fortunei, Fortune's yew plum
Cephalotaxus harringtonii, Harrington's plum yew
Cephalotaxus sinensis, Chinese plum yew
Chamaecyparis pisifera, sawara cypress
Chamaecyparis thyoides, Atlantic white cedar
Cunninghamia lanceolata, Chinese fir
Cupressus arizonica, Arizona cypress
Cupressus lusitanica, cedar of Goa
Cupressus macnabiana, Macnab cypress
Cupressus sempervirens, Mediterranean cypress
Cupressus torulosa, Himalayan cypress
Dacrycarpus cinctus
Dacrycarpus compactus
Dacrycarpus cumingii
Dacrycarpus dacrydioides
Dacrycarpus expansus
Dacrycarpus imbricatus
Dacrycarpus kinabaluensis
Dacrycarpus vieillardii
Dacrydium araucarioides
Dacrydium balansae
Dacrydium beccarii
Dacrydium cornwallianum
Dacrydium cupressinum
Dacrydium elatum
Dacrydium ericoides
Dacrydium gibbsiae
Dacrydium nidulum
Dacrydium novoguineense
Dacrydium xanthandrum
Diselma archeri, Cheshunt pine
Falcatifolium papuanum
Falcatifolium taxoides
Halocarpus bidwillii, bog pine
Halocarpus biformis, pink pine
Juniperus arizonica, Arizona juniper
Juniperus ashei, Ashe juniper
Juniperus californica, California juniper
Juniperus chinensis, Chinese juniper
Juniperus coahuilensis
Juniperus communis, common juniper
Juniperus convallium
Juniperus deppeana, alligator juniper
Juniperus drupacea, Syrian juniper
Juniperus durangensis
Juniperus excelsa, Greek juniper
Juniperus flaccida, weeping juniper
Juniperus foetidissima, stinking juniper
Juniperus formosana, Formosan juniper
Juniperus horizontalis, Waukegan juniper
Juniperus indica, black juniper
Juniperus komarovii
Juniperus monosperma, one-seed juniper
Juniperus monticola
Juniperus occidentalis, western juniper
Juniperus osteosperma, Utah juniper
Juniperus oxycedrus, prickly juniper
Juniperus phoenicea, Phoenician juniper
Juniperus pinchottii, Pinchot juniper
Juniperus procera, African pencil cedar
Juniperus procumbens
Juniperus przewalskii, Przewalsi juniper
Juniperus pseudosabina
Juniperus recurva, sacred juniper
Juniperus rigida, needle juniper
Juniperus sabina, Savin juniper
Juniperus saltuaria
Juniperus scopulorum, Rocky Mountain juniper
Juniperus semiglobosa
Juniperus squamata, Nepalese juniper
Juniperus thurifera, Spanish juniper
Juniperus virginiana, eastern redcedar
Keteleeria davidiana
Lagarostrobos franklinii, Huon pine
Larix decidua, European larch
Larix gmelinii, Dahurian larch
Larix griffithii, Sikkim larch
Larix kaempferi, Japanese larch
Larix laricina, tamarack
Larix lyallii, alpine larch
Larix occidentalis, western larch
Larix potaninii, Chinese larch
Larix sibirica, Siberian larch
Lepidothamnus fonkii, Chilean rimu
Lepidothamnus intermedius, yellow silver pine
Lepidothamnus laxifolius
Manoao colensoi, silver pine
Microbiota decussata, Siberian cypress
Microcachrys tetragona, creeping pine
Nageia wallichiana
Papuacedrus papuana
Phyllocladus aspleniifolius
Phyllocladus hypophyllus
Phyllocladus toatoa
Phyllocladus trichomanoides, mountain toatoa
Picea abies, Norway spruce
Picea crassifolia, Qinghai spruce
Picea engelmannii, Engelmann spruce
Picea glauca, white sprue
Picea glehnii, Sakhalin spruce
Picea jezoensis, Yezo spruce
Picea koraiensis, Korean spruce
Picea mariana, black spruce
Picea obovata, Siberian spruce
Picea orientalis, Oriental spruce
Picea pungens, blue spruce
Picea rubens, red spruce
Picea schrenkiana, Schrenk's spruce
Picea sitchensis, Sitka spruce
Picea smithiana, Indian spruce
Picea spinulosa, Sikkim spruce
Picea wilsonii, Wilson spruce
Pinus aristata, Colorado bristlecone pine
Pinus arizonica, Arizona pine
Pinus armandii, Armand's pine
Pinus attenuata, knobcone pine
Pinus ayacahuite, Mexican white pine
Pinus banksiana, jack pine
Pinus bhutanica, Bhutan white pine
Pinus brutia, Calabrian pine
Pinus bungeana, lace-bark pine
Pinus canariensis, canary pine
Pinus caribaea, Caribbean pine
Pinus cembra, Arolla pine
Pinus cembroides, Mexican nut pine
Pinus clausa, sand pine
Pinus contorta, lodgepole pine
Pinus cubensis, Cuban pine
Pinus densata, Gaoshan pine
Pinus densiflora, Japanese red pine
Pinus devoniana, Michoacan pine
Pinus douglasiana, Douglas pine
Pinus echinata, shortleaf pine
Pinus edulis, Colorado pinyon
Pinus elliottii, slash pine
Pinus engelmannii, Apache pine
Pinus flexilis, limber pine
Pinus glabra, spruce pine
Pinus halepensis, Aleppo pine
Pinus hartwegii, Hartweg's pine
Pinus heldreichii, Heldreich's pine
Pinus herrerae, Herrera's pine
Pinus hwangshanensis, Huangshan pine
Pinus jeffreyi, Jeffrey pine
Pinus kesiya, Khasia pine
Pinus koraiensis, Korean pine
Pinus lambertiana, sugar pine
Pinus lawsonii, Lawson's pine
Pinus leiophylla, smooth-leaved pine
Pinus longaeva, Great Basin bristlecone pine
Pinus luchuensis, Luchu pine
Pinus luzmariae
Pinus massoniana, Masson's pine
Pinus maximinoi, thin-leaf pine
Pinus monophylla, single leaf pinyon pine
Pinus montezumae, Montezuma pine
Pinus mugo, Mugo pine
Pinus nigra, Austrian pine
Pinus oocarpa, egg-cone pine
Pinus parviflora, Japanese white pine
Pinus patula, jelecote pine
Pinus pinaster, maritime pine
Pinus pinceana, weeping pinyon pine
Pinus pinea, stone pine
Pinus ponderosa, ponderosa pine
Pinus pringlei, Pringle's pine
Pinus pseudostrobus, smooth-bark Mexican pine
Pinus pumila, dwarf Siberian pine
Pinus pungens, Table Mountain pine
Pinus quadrifolia, Parry pinyon
Pinus remota, Texas pinyon pine
Pinus resinosa, Norway pine
Pinus rigida, hard pine
Pinus roxburghii, chir pine
Pinus sabiniana, gray pine
Pinus serotina, pond pine
Pinus sibirica, Siberian pine
Pinus strobiformis, southwestern white pine
Pinus strobus, eastern white pine
Pinus sylvestris, Scots pine
Pinus tabuliformis
Pinus taeda, loblolly pine
Pinus taiwanensis, Taiwan black pine
Pinus teocote, Aztec pine
Pinus thunbergii, Japanese black pine
Pinus uncinata
Pinus virginiana, Virginia pine
Pinus wallichiana, Himalayan white pine
Pinus yunnanensis, Yunnan pine
Podocarpus acutifolius, Westland totara
Podocarpus aracensis
Podocarpus borneensis
Podocarpus bracteatus
Podocarpus brasiliensis
Podocarpus brassii
Podocarpus celatus
Podocarpus coriaceus
Podocarpus crassigemma
Podocarpus cunninghamii, Hall's totara
Podocarpus dispermus, broad-leaved brown pine
Podocarpus drouynianus, emu berry
Podocarpus ekmanii
Podocarpus elatus, Illawarra plum
Podocarpus elongatus, Breede River yellowwood
Podocarpus glaucus
Podocarpus grayae
Podocarpus guatemalensis
Podocarpus insularis
Podocarpus latifolius, broad-leaved yellowwood
Podocarpus lawrencei, mountain plum pine
Podocarpus ledermannii
Podocarpus levis
Podocarpus lucienii
Podocarpus macrophyllus, Buddhist pine
Podocarpus magnifolius
Podocarpus milanjianus
Podocarpus neriifolius
Podocarpus nivalis, alpine totara
Podocarpus novae-caledoniae
Podocarpus oleifolius
Podocarpus pilgeri
Podocarpus pseudobracteatus
Podocarpus roraimae
Podocarpus rubens
Podocarpus salicifolius
Podocarpus smithii
Podocarpus spinulosus
Podocarpus steyermarkii
Podocarpus sylvestris
Podocarpus tepuiensis
Podocarpus totara
Prumnopitys ferruginea, miro
Prumnopitys ferruginoides
Prumnopitys taxifolia, matai
Pseudotsuga menziesii, Douglas fir
Retrophyllum comptonii
Retrophyllum vitiense
Sundacarpus amarus, choopoola
Taxodium distichum, bald cypress
Taxodium mucronatum, Montezuma bald cypress
Taxus baccata, common yew
Taxus canadensis
Taxus cuspidata, Japanese yew
Tetraclinis articulata, sandarac
Thuja occidentalis, northern white cedar
Thuja plicata, western red-cedar
Thujopsis dolabrata, hiba arbor-vitae
Torreya grandis, Chinese nutmeg tree
Torreya nucifera, Japanese nutmeg tree
Tsuga chinensis, Chinese hemlock
Tsuga diversifolia, northern Japanese hemlock
Tsuga dumosa, Himalayan hemlock
Tsuga heterophylla, western hemlock
Tsuga mertensiana, mountain hemlock
Widdringtonia nodiflora, mountain cypress
Xanthocyparis nootkatensis, Alaska cedar

Subspecies

Abies chensiensis subsp. chensiensis, Qin ling leng Shan
Abies chensiensis subsp. salouenensis, Salween fir
Abies chensiensis subsp. yulongxueshanensis
Abies nordmanniana subsp. nordmanniana
Abies sibirica subsp. semenovii, Tienshan fir
Abies sibirica subsp. sibirica
Agathis robusta subsp. robusta, Queensland kauri
Juniperus excelsa subsp. excelsa
Juniperus excelsa subsp. polycarpos, Turkestan juniper
Juniperus oxycedrus subsp. badia
Juniperus oxycedrus subsp. macrocarpa
Juniperus oxycedrus subsp. oxycedrus
Juniperus rigida subsp. conferta, shore juniper
Juniperus rigida subsp. rigida
Picea jezoensis subsp. hondoensis, Hondo spruce
Picea jezoensis subsp. jezoensis
Picea schrenkiana subsp. schrenkiana
Picea schrenkiana subsp. tianschanica, Tian Shan spruce
Pinus nigra subsp. laricio
Pinus nigra subsp. nigra
Pinus nigra subsp. pallasiana
Pinus nigra subsp. salzmannii
Tsuga mertensiana subsp. grandicona

Varieties

Abies balsamea var. balsamea
Abies delavayi var. delavayi
Abies delavayi var. motuoensis, Medoc fir
Abies fargesii var. fargesii
Abies fargesii var. sutchuensis
Abies forrestii var. ferreana
Abies forrestii var. georgei, George's fir
Abies sachalinensis var. mayriana
Abies sachalinensis var. sachalinensis
Abies veitchii var. veitchii
Araucaria cunninghamii var. cunninghamii
Araucaria cunninghamii var. papuana
Cephalotaxus fortunei var. fortunei, Fortune's plum yew
Cephalotaxus harringtonii var. harringtonii
Cephalotaxus harringtonii var. nana
Chamaecyparis thyoides var. henryae, southern white cedar
Cupressus lusitanica var. lusitanica
Cupressus torulosa var. torulosa
Juniperus ashei var. ashei
Juniperus chinensis var. chinensis
Juniperus chinensis var. sargentii, Sargent juniper
Juniperus convallium var. convallium
Juniperus deppeana var. deppeana
Juniperus deppeana var. pachyphlaea
Juniperus flaccida var. flaccida
Juniperus indica var. caespitosa
Juniperus indica var. indica
Juniperus occidentalis var. australis, Sierra juniper
Juniperus occidentalis var. occidentalis
Juniperus recurva var. recurva
Juniperus sabina var. arenaria
Juniperus sabina var. davurica
Juniperus sabina var. sabina
Juniperus virginiana var. silicicola, coast juniper
Juniperus virginiana var. virginiana
Keteleeria davidiana var. davidiana
Larix gmelinii var. gmelinii
Larix gmelinii var. japonica
Larix gmelinii var. principis-rupprechtii, Prince Rupprecht's larch
Larix potaninii var. macrocarpa
Larix potaninii var. potaninii
Phyllocladus trichomanoides var. alpinus
Phyllocladus trichomanoides var. trichomanoides
Picea koraiensis var. koraiensis
Pinus armandii var. armandii
Pinus caribaea var. hondurensis
Pinus massoniana var. massoniana
Pinus parviflora var. parviflora
Pinus parviflora var. pentaphylla
Pinus patula var. longipedunculata
Pinus patula var. patula
Pinus tabuliformis var. mukdensis
Pinus tabuliformis var. tabuliformis
Pinus taiwanensis var. taiwanensis
Pinus wallichiana var. parva
Pinus wallichiana var. wallichiana
Pinus yunnanensis var. pygmaea
Pinus yunnanensis var. yunnanensis
Podocarpus macrophyllus var. macrophyllus
Podocarpus neriifolius var. degeneri
Taxus cuspidata var. cuspidata
Thujopsis dolabrata var. dolabrata
Thujopsis dolabrata var. hondae
Torreya grandis var. grandis
Tsuga chinensis var. chinensis
Tsuga chinensis var. oblongisquamata

Gnetopsida
There are 76 species in the class Gnetopsida assessed as least concern.

Gnetales

Gnetum bosavicum
Gnetum camporum
Gnetum costatum
Gnetum cuspidatum
Gnetum formosum
Gnetum gnemon
Gnetum gnemonoides
Gnetum hainanense
Gnetum klossii
Gnetum latifolium
Gnetum leptostachyum
Gnetum leyboldii
Gnetum macrostachyum
Gnetum microcarpum
Gnetum montanum
Gnetum nodiflorum
Gnetum paniculatum
Gnetum parvifolium
Gnetum pendulum
Gnetum raya
Gnetum schwackeanum
Gnetum tenuifolium
Gnetum ula
Gnetum urens, bell bird's heart
Gnetum venosum

Ephedrales

Ephedra alata
Ephedra altissima
Ephedra americana
Ephedra antisyphilitica, clipweed
Ephedra aphylla
Ephedra aspera, boundary ephedra
Ephedra boelckei
Ephedra breana
Ephedra californica, California ephedra
Ephedra chilensis
Ephedra compacta
Ephedra coryi
Ephedra cutleri, Cutler morning-tea
Ephedra dahurica
Ephedra dawuensis
Ephedra distachya, sea grape
Ephedra fasciculata, Arizona joint-fir
Ephedra fedtschenkoae
Ephedra foeminea
Ephedra foliata, shrubby horsetail
Ephedra fragilis, joint pine
Ephedra frustillata
Ephedra intermedia
Ephedra kardangensis
Ephedra laristanica
Ephedra likiangensis
Ephedra lomatolepis
Ephedra major
Ephedra milleri
Ephedra minuta
Ephedra monosperma
Ephedra multiflora
Ephedra nevadensis, gray ephedra
Ephedra ochreata
Ephedra pachyclada
Ephedra pedunculata, vine ephedra
Ephedra przewalskii
Ephedra regeliana
Ephedra rhytidosperma
Ephedra rituensis
Ephedra rupestris
Ephedra sarcocarpa
Ephedra sinica, Chinese ephedra
Ephedra somalensis
Ephedra strobilacea
Ephedra torreyana, Torrey ephedra
Ephedra transitoria
Ephedra triandra
Ephedra trifurca, American ephedra
Ephedra tweediana
Ephedra viridis, green ephedra

Dicotyledons
There are 4104 species, 86 subspecies, and 44 varieties of dicotyledon assessed as least concern.

Piperales

Peperomia petiolata
Peperomia pseudopereskiifolia
Piper laevigatum
Piper truman-yunckeri
Saururus cernuus

Campanulales
There are 25 species and four subspecies in Campanulales assessed as least concern.

Campanulaceae

Species

Burmeistera sodiroana
Campanula aparinoides
Campanula balfourii
Campanula morettiana
Campanula serrata
Downingia elegans
Downingia laeta
Favratia zoysii
Lobelia aberdarica
Lobelia alsinoides
Lobelia cardinalis
Lobelia dortmanna, water lobelia
Lobelia heyneana
Lobelia kalmii
Lobelia siphilitica
Lobelia spicata
Lobelia zeylanica
Musschia aurea
Namacodon schinzianum
Physoplexis comosa
Siphocampylus scandens
Sphenoclea zeylanica
Wahlenbergia polycephala
Wahlenbergia pulchella

Subspecies

Wahlenbergia pulchella subsp. mbalensis
Wahlenbergia pulchella subsp. paradoxa
Wahlenbergia pulchella subsp. pedicellata
Wahlenbergia pulchella subsp. pulchella

Goodeniaceae
Scaevola floribunda

Theales
There are 129 species and three subspecies in Theales assessed as least concern.

Dipterocarpaceae

Species

Dipterocarpus intricatus
Dipterocarpus oblongifolius
Dipterocarpus obtusifolius
Dipterocarpus tuberculatus
Shorea curtisii
Shorea laevis
Shorea multiflora
Shorea obtusa
Shorea robusta
Shorea siamensis
Vatica rassak
Vatica umbonata

Subspecies

Pakaraimaea dipterocarpacea subsp. nitida
Vatica odorata subsp. odorata
Vatica umbonata subsp. acrocarpa

Asteropeiaceae
Asteropeia multiflora

Scytopetalaceae
Rhaptopetalum beguei

Ochnaceae

Brackenridgea hookeri
Euthemis minor
Gomphia serrata

Theaceae

Camellia anlungensis
Camellia brevistyla
Camellia caudata
Camellia confusa
Camellia cordifolia
Camellia costei
Camellia crassicolumna
Camellia cuspidata
Camellia edithae
Camellia euryoides
Camellia fluviatilis
Camellia forrestii
Camellia fraterna
Camellia furfuracea
Camellia gymnogyna
Camellia japonica
Camellia kissii, Nepal camellia
Camellia lanceolata
Camellia lawii
Camellia lutchuensis
Camellia mairei
Camellia oleifera
Camellia pitardii
Camellia polyodonta
Camellia rhytidocarpa
Camellia rosthorniana
Camellia salicifolia
Camellia saluenensis
Camellia sasanqua
Camellia semiserrata
Camellia synaptica
Camellia taliensis
Camellia tsaii
Camellia tsingpienensis
Camellia yunnanensis
Eurya rapensis
Gordonia lasianthus, loblolly bay
Stewartia malacodendron, silky camellia
Stewartia ovata, mountain camellia

Actinidiaceae

Saurauia aequatoriensis
Saurauia crassisepala
Saurauia herthae
Saurauia pentapetala
Saurauia pseudostrigillosa
Saurauia pustulata
Saurauia scabrida

Guttiferae

Calophyllum bicolor
Calophyllum euryphyllum
Calophyllum goniocarpum
Calophyllum inophyllum, Alexandrian laurel
Calophyllum neo-ebudicum
Calophyllum novoguineense
Calophyllum papuanum
Calophyllum pauciflorum
Calophyllum peekelii
Calophyllum pisiferum
Calophyllum sil
Calophyllum soulattri
Calophyllum tetrapterum
Calophyllum vexans
Cratoxylum arborescens
Cratoxylum cochinchinense
Cratoxylum formosum
Cratoxylum maingayi
Garcinia burkillii
Garcinia cantleyana
Garcinia hendersoniana
Garcinia maingayi
Garcinia minutiflora
Garcinia monantha
Garcinia murtonii
Garcinia opaca
Garcinia prainiana
Garcinia pyrifera
Garcinia scortechinii
Garcinia uniflora
Hypericum anagalloides
Hypericum boreale
Hypericum corsicum
Hypericum ellipticum
Hypericum elodes
Hypericum llanganaticum
Hypericum majus
Hypericum quitense
Hypericum scopulorum
Hypericum socotranum
Hypericum tortuosum
Mesua daphnifolia
Mesua elegans
Mesua kunstleri
Mesua nivenii
Mesua nuda
Mesua wrayi
Triadenum fraseri
Triadenum virginicum

Sphaerosepalaceae

Rhopalocarpus alternifolius
Rhopalocarpus coriaceus
Rhopalocarpus louvelii
Rhopalocarpus lucidus
Rhopalocarpus macrorhamnifolius
Rhopalocarpus similis

Elatinaceae

Bergia anagalloides
Bergia polyantha
Elatine ambigua
Elatine americana
Elatine brachysperma
Elatine ecuadoriensis
Elatine gussonei
Elatine macropoda
Elatine minima
Elatine rubella
Elatine triandra

Malvales

Species

Abutilon depauperatum
Camptostemon schultzii
Corchorus erodiodes
Dombeya rotundifolia
Gossypium darwinii, Darwin's cotton
Heritiera littoralis
Hibiscus diriffan
Hibiscus moscheutos
Hibiscus quattenensis
Hibiscus stenanthus
Hildegardia erythrosiphon
Kosteletzkya pentacarpos
Leptolaena cuspidata
Leptolaena gautieri
Melhania phillipsiae
Nototriche jamesonii
Rhodognaphalon schumannianum, East African bombax
Rhodolaena coriacea
Rhodolaena humblotii
Sarcolaena eriophora
Sarcolaena multiflora
Sarcolaena oblongifolia
Scaphium macropodum, malva nut
Schizolaena exinvolucrata
Schizolaena hystrix
Sloanea assamica
Sloanea tomentosa
Sterculia parviflora
Thespesiopsis mossambicensis, Thespesia mossambicensis
Tilia platyphyllos, large-leaved lime
Triplochiton scleroxylon

Varieties
Tilia paucicostata var. yunnanensis

Geraniales

Species

Erodium foetidum, rock stork's-bill
Hydrocera triflora, marsh henna
Impatiens balansae
Impatiens baronii
Impatiens capensis
Impatiens hydrogetonoides
Impatiens leedalii
Impatiens meruensis
Impatiens noli-tangere
Oxalis ausensis
Oxalis disticha
Oxalis dregei
Oxalis luederitzii
Oxalis schaeferi
Sarcotheca glomerula

Subspecies
Impatiens hydrogetonoides subsp. hydrogetonoides

Lecythidales

Barringtonia asiatica
Couroupita guianensis, cannonball tree
Eschweilera integrifolia
Eschweilera pittieri
Lecythis ollaria

Polygalales

Species

Acridocarpus alopecurus
Acridocarpus socotranus
Acridocarpus zanzibaricus
Badiera propinqua
Malpighia cubensis, lady hair
Polygala calcarea, chalk milkwort
Polygala galapageia, Galapagos milkwort
Tristellateia africana

Varieties
Polygala galapageia var. galapageia

Santalales

Agelanthus kayseri
Arceuthobium oxycedri
Dipentodon sinicus
Englerina heckmanniana
Englerina holstii
Englerina kwaiensis
Erianthemum rotundifolium
Geocaulon lividum
Globimetula pachyclada
Heisteria maguirei
Oncella ambigua
Phoradendron henslovii, Galápagos mistletoe
Scleropyrum wallichianum

Dipsacales

Lonicera caerulea
Lonicera oblongifolia
Valeriana alypifolia
Valeriana aretioides
Valeriana dioica
Valeriana tuberosa, tuberous valerian
Valeriana uliginosa
Zabelia corymbosa

Plumbaginales

Aegialitis annulata
Limonium multiflorum
Limonium paulayanum
Limonium sokotranum
Plumbago wissii

Rubiales

Species

Breonia chinensis
Breonia decaryana
Breonia fragifera
Breonia perrieri
Catesbaea parviflora
Cephalanthus occidentalis
Chassalia bojeri
Chassalia catatii
Chassalia princei
Chiococca alba
Coprosma nephelephila
Coprosma orohenensis
Coprosma reticulata
Dentella repens
Dirichletia obovata 
Ernodea littoralis
Gaertnera arenaria
Gaertnera macrobotrys
Gaertnera macrostipula
Gaertnera madagascariensis
Gaertnera obovata
Gaertnera phanerophlebia
Gaertnera phyllosepala
Gaertnera phyllostachya
Gaillonia puberula
Gaillonia tinctoria
Galium ascendens
Galium asprellum
Galium debile, slender marsh-bedstraw
Galium labradoricum
Galium palustre
Galium tinctorium
Galium trifidum
Galium triflorum
Galium uliginosum, fen bedstraw
Gardenia gummifera
Gardenia hutchinsoniana
Guettarda krugii, frogwood
Guettarda scabra
Hymenodictyon berivotrense
Hymenodictyon decaryi
Hymenodictyon louhavate
Hymenodictyon occidentale
Hymenodictyon perrieri
Hymenodictyon septentrionale
Ixora moorensis
Ixora oligantha
Ixora setchellii
Ixora stokesii
Oldenlandia balfourii
Oldenlandia bicornuta
Oldenlandia capensis
Oldenlandia diffusa, snake-needle grass
Oldenlandia pulvinata
Pentodon pentandrus
Placopoda virgata
Psychotria chalconeura
Psychotria glabrata
Psychotria ligustrifolia, smooth wild coffee
Psychotria raivavaensis
Psychotria urbaniana
Rachicallis americana
Scyphiphora hydrophylacea
Spermacoce tetraquetra, pineland false buttonweed
Stenostomum coriaceum, peg wood
Stenostomum lucidum
Stenostomum myrtifolium
Strumpfia maritima
Tamridaea capsulifera

Subspecies
Canthium glaucum subsp. frangula
Canthium glaucum subsp. glaucum

Violales

Species

Adenia globosa
Adenia keramanthus
Adenia kirkii
Adenia lindiensis
Adenia pechuelii
Casearia aculeata, cockspur
Casearia barteri
Homalium acuminatum, Rarotonga homalium
Homalium foetidum
Homalium longifolium
Homalium moto
Homalium mouo
Homalium rufescens
Lacistema robustum
Paropsia grewioides
Passiflora indecora
Passiflora monadelpha
Passiflora smilacifolia
Passiflora sprucei
Rinorea dasyadena
Schlechterina mitostemmatoides
Tamarix androssowii
Tamarix kotschyi
Tamarix mascatensis
Tamarix nilotica
Tamarix octandra
Tamarix parviflora
Tamarix ramosissima
Tamarix tetragyna, tamarisk
Tamarix tetrandra
Viola lanceolata
Viola macloskeyi
Viola maroccana
Viola nephrophylla
Viola obliqua
Viola palustris
Viola renifolia

Subspecies

Adenia globosa subsp. globosa
Viola rupestris subsp. relicta
Xylosma suaveolens subsp. gracile
Xylosma suaveolens subsp. pubigerum
Xylosma suaveolens subsp. suaveolens

Euphorbiales

Euphorbiaceae

Species

Acalypha parvula
Argythamnia proctorii, Cayman silverbush
Astrocasia tremula
Caperonia zaponzeta
Chrozophora tinctoria, Dyer's litmus
Claoxylon collenettei
Croton scouleri
Croton socotranus
Erythrococca berberidea
Euphorbia adenopoda
Euphorbia alluaudii
Euphorbia amplexicaulis, chamaesyce
Euphorbia angrae
Euphorbia antso
Euphorbia aprica
Euphorbia arahaka
Euphorbia boivinii
Euphorbia cuneifolia
Euphorbia denisii
Euphorbia dichroa
Euphorbia emirnensis
Euphorbia enterophora
Euphorbia fiherenensis
Euphorbia friedrichiae
Euphorbia intisy
Euphorbia kaokoensis
Euphorbia kischenensis
Euphorbia lavrani
Euphorbia mainty
Euphorbia namibensis
Euphorbia nevadensis
Euphorbia nummularia
Euphorbia orthoclada
Euphorbia pachysantha
Euphorbia palustris
Euphorbia paniculata
Euphorbia pervilleana
Euphorbia petraea
Euphorbia physoclada
Euphorbia plagiantha
Euphorbia punctulata
Euphorbia rangovalensis
Euphorbia recurva
Euphorbia spiralis
Euphorbia stenoclada
Euphorbia tetraptera
Euphorbia tirucalli
Euphorbia torralbasii
Euphorbia transtagana
Euphorbia verruculosa
Euphorbia viminea
Excoecaria agallocha
Glochidion longfieldiae
Glochidion marchionicum
Glochidion moorei
Glochidion myrtifolium
Glochidion taitense
Glochidion temehaniense
Homonoia retusa
Homonoia riparia, willow-leaved water croton
Jatropha unicostata
Macaranga attenuata
Macaranga venosa
Phyllanthus aeneus
Phyllanthus faguetii
Phyllanthus ivohibeus
Phyllanthus kaessneri
Phyllanthus matitanensis
Phyllanthus nutans
Phyllanthus oreichtitus
Tragia balfourii

Subspecies

Euphorbia enterophora subsp. enterophora
Euphorbia orthoclada subsp. orthoclada
Euphorbia stenoclada subsp. stenoclada
Phyllanthus nutans subsp. nutans

Varieties

Euphorbia boivinii var. boivinii
Euphorbia boivinii var. oreades
Euphorbia tetraptera var. tetraptera
Jatropha hildebrandtii var. torrentis-lugardi
Phyllanthus aeneus var. aeneus
Phyllanthus kaessneri var. polycytotrichus

Laurales
There are 37 species and one subspecies in the order Laurales assessed as least concern.

Lauraceae

Actinodaphne malaccensis
Actinodaphne montana
Actinodaphne pruinosa
Aiouea acarodomatifera
Aiouea benthamiana
Aiouea lehmannii
Alseodaphne foxiana
Alseodaphne macrantha
Alseodaphne ridleyi
Aniba robusta
Aniba venezuelana
Beilschmiedia insignis
Beilschmiedia lumutensis
Beilschmiedia pahangensis
Cinnadenia paniculata
Cryptocarya bracteolata
Cryptocarya wrayi
Endiandra maingayi
Endiandra wrayi
Endlicheria punctulata
Lindera reticulosa
Lindera wrayi
Litsea cinerascens
Litsea curtisii
Litsea penangiana
Litsea spathacea
Litsea wrayi
Nectandra coeloclada
Nectandra crassiloba
Nothaphoebe kingiana
Ocotea aciphylla
Ocotea cymbarum
Ocotea puberula
Persea pyrifolia

Other Laurales

Species

Hernandia nukuhivensis
Kibara coriacea
Matthaea sancta

Subspecies
Trimenia weinmanniifolia subsp. marquesensis

Cucurbitales

Anisophyllea beccariana
Anisophyllea corneri
Anisophyllea disticha
Anisophyllea griffithii
Begonia socotrana
Cionosicys pomiformis, duppy gourd
Cucumella clavipetiolata
Octomeles sumatrana
Tetrameles nudiflora

Ebenales
There are 43 species and two subspecies in Ebenales assessed as least concern.

Sapotaceae

Species

Chromolucuma baehniana
Chromolucuma rubriflora
Chrysophyllum scalare
Ecclinusa bullata
Ecclinusa ulei
Micropholis cayennensis
Micropholis sanctae-rosae
Palaquium maingayi
Payena maingayi
Pichonia balansana
Pouteria cayennensis
Pouteria franciscana
Pouteria melanopoda
Pouteria orinocoensis
Pouteria sagotiana
Pouteria scrobiculata
Pouteria tenuisepala
Pouteria trigonosperma
Pouteria virescens
Pradosia grisebachii
Pradosia verticillata
Vitellariopsis dispar

Subspecies
Pouteria reticulata subsp. surinamensis
Sarcaulus brasiliensis subsp. gracilis

Ebenaceae

Diospyros adenophora
Diospyros apiculata
Diospyros areolata
Diospyros argentea
Diospyros bibracteata
Diospyros ekodul
Diospyros foxworthyi
Diospyros ismailii
Diospyros latisepala
Diospyros lotus, date-plum
Diospyros nutans
Diospyros penangiana
Diospyros ridleyi
Diospyros rufa
Diospyros scortechinii
Diospyros singaporensis
Diospyros transitoria
Diospyros trengganuensis
Diospyros tristis
Diospyros yomomo

Styracaceae
Alniphyllum eberhardtii

Celastrales
There are 22 species, one subspecies, and one variety in the order Celastrales assessed as least concern.

Celastraceae

Species

Bhesa paniculata
Bhesa robusta
Cassine viburnifolia
Catha edulis, khat
Crossopetalum caymanense
Crossopetalum parvifolium
Elaeodendron fruticosum
Euonymus cochinchinensis
Euonymus grandiflorus
Euonymus javanicus
Euonymus koopmannii
Euonymus verrucosus
Lophopetalum javanicum
Lophopetalum wightianum
Maytenus umbellata
Siphonodon celastrineus

Subspecies
Euonymus latifolius subsp. cauconis
Varieties
Maytenus mossambicensis var. gurueensis

Other Celastrales species

Azima sarmentosa
Citronella mucronata
Dichapetalum barbosae
Ilex diospyroides
Nemopanthus mucronatus
Tapura tchoutoi

Myrtales
There are 149 species in the order Myrtales assessed as least concern.

Myrtaceae

Decaspermum vitiense, Fiji Christmas bush
Eugenia anisosepala
Eugenia duthieana
Eugenia dyeriana
Eugenia flosculifera
Eugenia glauca
Eugenia goodenovii
Eugenia gramae-andersonii, Syzygium graeme-andersoniae
Eugenia inasensis
Eugenia jasminifolia
Eugenia kemamensis
Eugenia kiahii
Eugenia koordersiana
Eugenia laevicaulis
Eugenia nemestrina
Eugenia oblongifolia
Syzygium oreophilum
Eugenia pauper
Eugenia pendens
Eugenia perakensis
Eugenia pergamentacea
Eugenia polita
Eugenia prainiana
Eugenia quadribracteata
Eugenia ridleyi
Eugenia scortechinii
Eugenia stapfiana
Eugenia symingtoniana
Eugenia variolosa
Eugenia wrayi
Osbornia octodonta
Pseudoeugenia perakiana
Pseudoeugenia singaporensis
Syzygium cordatum
Syzygium diffusum
Syzygium fijiense
Syzygium purpureum
Syzygium seemannianum

Melastomataceae

Astronidium fraternum
Astronidium glabrum
Astronidium ligulatum
Astronidium robustum
Astronidium saccatum
Astronidium victoriae
Axinaea merianiae
Blakea subvaginata
Brachyotum alpinum
Brachyotum confertum
Conostegia centronioides
Dionychastrum schliebenii
Dissotis dichaetantheroides
Dissotis polyantha
Lijndenia udzungwarum
Medinilla engleri
Memecylon deminutum
Memecylon elaeagni
Memecylon greenwayi
Memecylon trunciflorum
Meriania drakei
Miconia caesariata
Miconia glandulistyla
Miconia papillosa
Miconia phaeochaeta
Miconia rivetii
Miconia tomentosa
Mouriri gleasoniana
Rhexia virginica
Triolena pustulata
Warneckea erubescens
Warneckea microphylla

Combretaceae

Conocarpus erectus, silver-leaved buttonwood
Laguncularia racemosa, white mangrove
Lumnitzera littorea
Lumnitzera racemosa

Thymelaeaceae

Atemnosiphon coriaceus
Daphne petraea
Daphnopsis occidentalis, burn nose
Gnidia daphnifolia
Gnidia socotrana
Octolepis dioica
Peddiea involucrata
Restella alberti
Stephanodaphne geminata
Wikstroemia coriacea

Water caltrops
Trapa incisa
Trapa natans, water chestnut

Lythraceae

Ammannia auriculata
Ammannia baccifera, blistering ammania
Ammannia multiflora
Ammannia octandra
Ammannia robusta
Ammannia senegalensis, red ammannia
Ammannia verticillata
Decodon verticillatus
Lafoensia pacari
Lythrum alatum
Lythrum borysthenicum, loosestrife
Lythrum hyssopifolia, grass-poly
Lythrum junceum, false grass-poly
Lythrum portula, spatulaleaf loosestrife
Lythrum salicaria, purple loosestrife
Lythrum thymifolia, thymeleaf loosestrife
Lythrum tribracteatum, threebract loosestrife
Nesaea brevipes
Nesaea prostrata
Pemphis acidula
Punica granatum, pomegranate
Rotala densiflora
Rotala fimbriata
Rotala fluitans
Rotala illecebroides
Rotala indica
Rotala macrandra
Rotala malampuzhensis
Rotala mexicana
Rotala occultiflora
Rotala ramosior
Rotala rosea
Rotala rotundifolia
Rotala serpyllifolia
Rotala verticillaris
Sonneratia alba
Sonneratia apetala
Sonneratia caseolaris
Sonneratia lanceolata
Woodfordia fruticosa

Onagraceae

Boisduvalia glabella
Epilobium anatolicum
Epilobium angustifolium, fireweed
Epilobium ciliatum
Epilobium coloratum
Epilobium confusum
Epilobium hirsutum
Epilobium latifolium
Epilobium leptophyllum
Epilobium minutiflorum
Epilobium palustre
Epilobium parviflorum, hoary willowherb
Epilobium strictum
Fuchsia loxensis
Fuchsia orientalis
Fuchsia sylvatica
Ludwigia alternifolia
Ludwigia hyssopifolia, seed box
Ludwigia octovalvis
Ludwigia palustris, Hampshire-purslane
Ludwigia perennis
Ludwigia polycarpa
Ludwigia stolonifera, creeping ludwigia

Sapindales
There are 83 species, three subspecies, and four varieties in the order Sapindales assessed as least concern.

Rutaceae

Species

Melicope revoluta
Picrella trifoliata
Zanthoxylum delagoense

Varieties
Picrella trifoliata var. trifoliata

Sapindaceae

Species

Allophylus rhomboidalis
Arytera littoralis
Arytera macrobotrys
Cubilia cubili
Erythrophysa transvaalensis
Nephelium lappaceum, rambutan
Podonephelium gongrocarpum
Podonephelium homei
Podonephelium pachycaule

Varieties
Alectryon excelsus var. grandis, Three Kings titoki

Zygophyllaceae

Kallstroemia adscendens
Neoluederitzia sericeocarpa
Nitraria schoberi
Zygophyllum giessii

Anacardiaceae

Species

Abrahamia grandidieri
Abrahamia sericea
Campnosperma micranteium
Campnosperma schatzii
Gluta capituliflora
Gluta curtisii
Gluta lanceolata
Mangifera caesia
Mangifera foetida, horse mango
Mangifera gracilipes
Mangifera magnifica
Mangifera parvifolia
Mangifera sylvatica
Melanochyla nitida
Micronychia kotozafii
Micronychia macrophylla
Micronychia minutiflora
Micronychia tsiramiramy
Operculicarya decaryi, jabily
Pistacia eurycarpa
Pistacia khinjuk
Pistacia lentiscus, mastic tree
Pistacia malayana
Pistacia terebinthus, cyprus turpentine
Rhus thyrsiflora
Schinopsis balansae
Schinopsis quebracho-colorado
Swintonia robinsonii
Swintonia spicifera
Toxicodendron vernix

Subspecies
Rhus glutinosa subsp. glutinosa
Varieties
Mangifera quadrifida var. quadrifida
Ozoroa reticulata var. mossambicensis

Meliaceae

Aglaia argentea
Aglaia elaeagnoidea
Aglaia elliptica
Aglaia lawii
Aglaia odoratissima
Aglaia sapindina
Aglaia spectabilis
Aglaia tomentosa
Aphanamixis polystachya
Chisocheton tomentosus
Chukrasia tabularis
Dysoxylum alliaceum
Entandrophragma caudatum
Entandrophragma excelsum
Toona ciliata
Trichilia lovettii
Trichilia stellato-tomentosa
Turraea mombassana
Xylocarpus granatum
Xylocarpus moluccensis

Simaroubaceae

Species

Ailanthus integrifolia, white siris
Castela galapageia, bitterbush
Kirkia burgeri
Kirkia dewinteri

Subspecies
Kirkia burgeri subsp. burgeri

Burseraceae

Species

Canarium asperum
Canarium littorale
Canarium patentinervium
Dacryodes costata
Dacryodes laxa
Dacryodes rostrata
Protium asperum
Santiria apiculata
Santiria griffithii
Santiria laevigata
Santiria tomentosa
Scutinanthe brunnea

Subspecies
Canarium pilosum subsp. pilosum

Irvingiaceae
Irvingia malayana

Asterales

Species

Achillea crithmifolia
Achillea glaberrima
Achillea millefolium, milfoil
Achillea ptarmica, sneezewort
Acmella paniculata, panicled spot flower
Acmella uliginosa
Adenostemma caffrum
Aedesia glabra
Aetheolaena involucrata
Ageratina macbridei
Ageratina sodiroi
Anacyclus ciliatus, ciliated German pellitory
Anisopappus pseudopinnatifidus
Aphanactis jamesoniana
Aphanactis ollgaardii
Arctanthemum arcticum
Arctotis frutescens
Aristeguietia glutinosa
Arnica montana
Artemisia eriantha
Artemisia genipi
Artemisia umbelliformis, alpine wormwood
Aspilia helianthoides
Aster subulatus
Bellis bernardii
Bellis caerulescens
Bellis hyrcanica, Hyrkanian daisy
Bellium nivale
Bidens beckii
Bidens cernua, nodding bur-marigold
Bidens frondosa
Bidens hyperborea
Bidens trichosperma
Bidens tripartita, trifid bur-marigold
Bidens vulgata
Boltonia asteroides
Caesulia axillaris, pink node flower
Calendula maderensis
Canadanthus modestus
Carduus nyassanus
Carlina gummifera, stemless atractylis
Centipeda minima, spreading sneeze weed
Chamaemelum nobile, Roman chamomile
Chevreulia lycopodioides, clubmoss cudweed
Chrysanthellum pusillum
Cirsium brachycephalum
Cirsium dealbatum, whitish thistle
Cirsium imereticum, Imeretian thistle
Cirsium latifolium
Cirsium pugnax, armed thistle
Cirsium rhinoceros
Cirsium sosnowskyi, Sosnowsky's thistle
Conyza clarenceana
Cotula paludosa
Cousinia brachyptera, short-winged cousinia
Cousinia daralaghezica, daralaghesian cousinia
Cousinia macrocephala, macrocephalous cousinia
Crassocephalum gracile
Crassocephalum picridifolium
Cyathocline lutea
Cyathocline purpurea
Dicoma cana
Diplostephium antisanense
Diplostephium ericoides
Distephanus qazmi
Doellingeria umbellata
Doronicum corsicum
Dubautia plantaginea
Eclipta angustata
Emilia zeylanica
Enydra fluctuans, buffalo spinach
Epaltes divaricata
Eremothamnus marlothianus
Erigeron elatus
Erigeron lonchophyllus
Eriocephalus klinghardtensis
Ethulia conyzoides
Ethulia vernonioides
Eucephalus engelmannii
Eupatorium maculatum
Eupatorium perfoliatum
Eurybia radula
Euryops walterorum
Euthamia graminifolia
Felicia alba
Felicia gunillae
Fitchia rapensis
Fitchia speciosa, Rarotonga fitchia
Fleischmannia obscurifolia
Gnaphalium palustre
Gnaphalium unionis
Grangea maderaspatana
Gynoxys acostae
Gynoxys hallii
Helichrysum aciculare
Helichrysum arachnoides
Helichrysum balfourii
Helichrysum paulayanum
Helichrysum rosulatum
Helichrysum sphaerocephalum
Hemisteptia lyrata
Hypochaeris angustifolia
Hypochaeris sonchoides
Inula acaulis
Iva xanthifolia
Jaegeria gracilis, Galapagos jaegeria
Jaumea carnosa
Lactuca aurea
Lactuca palmensis
Lactuca pancicii
Lasiopogon ponticulus
Lasthenia glaberrima
Launaea rhynchocarpa
Launaea socotrana
Leontopodium alpinum, edelweiss
Leucheria suaveolens, vanilla daisy
Liabum kingii
Litogyne gariepina
Macraea laricifolia, needle-leafed daisy
Microseris borealis
Monticalia myrsinites
Nassauvia gaudichaudii, coastal nassauvia
Nassauvia serpens, snakeplant
Nidorella nordenstamii
Oclemena nemoralis
Onopordum cinereum, ash-coloured Scotch thistle
Oparanthus coriaceus
Oparanthus rapensis
Osteospermum muricatum
Osteospermum sanctae-helenae, boneseed
Othonna clavifolia
Pectis caymanensis, tea banker
Pectis subsquarrosa, pectis
Pectis tenuifolia, oily pectis
Pentatrichia avasmontana
Pentzia tomentosa
Petasites frigidus
Phagnalon bennettii
Plagiocheilus solivaeformis
Pluchea bequaertii
Pluchea sordida
Prenanthes abietina, fir-tree rattlesnake root
Psephellus carthalinicus, Carthalinian psephellus
Psephellus karabaghensis, Karabaghian psephellus
Psephellus leucophyllus, white-leaved psephellus
Psephellus prokhanovii, Prokhanov's psephellus
Psephellus somcheticus, Armenian psephellus
Psephellus vvedenskii, solnechnik
Psilocarphus tenellus
Pteronia spinulosa
Pulicaria arabica
Pulicaria diversifolia
Pulicaria elegans
Pulicaria inuloides
Pulicaria laciniata
Pulicaria lanata
Pulicaria scabra
Pulicaria sicula
Pulicaria stephanocarpa
Pulicaria vulgaris, small fleabane
Rhaponticum scariosum, giant scabiosa
Santolina impressa
Santolina semidentata
Scalesia affinis, radiate-headed scalesia
Scorzoneroides atlantica
Senecio aquaticus
Senecio arborescens
Senecio hydrophilus
Senecio littoralis, woolly Falkland daisy
Senecio morotonensis
Senecio vaginatus, smooth Falkland daisy
Senecio wightii, swamp ragwort
Solidago latissimifolia
Solidago ohioensis
Solidago patula
Solidago riddellii
Solidago uliginosa
Sonchus palustris
Sphaeranthus africanus
Sphaeranthus amaranthoides
Sphaeranthus chandleri
Sphaeranthus indicus
Sphaeranthus steetzii
Sphaeranthus ukambensis
Symphyotrichum boreale
Symphyotrichum ciliatum
Symphyotrichum lanceolatum
Symphyotrichum praealtum
Symphyotrichum puniceum
Tanacetum cinerariifolium, Dalmatian pyrethrum
Taraxacum desertorum, desert dandelion
Verbesina latisquama
Vernonia arborescens, fleabane
Vernonia cockburniana
Wedelia chinensis, Chinese wedelia
Werneria pumila

Subspecies
Centaurea micrantha subsp. herminii
Lactuca virosa subsp. cornigera
Varieties
Pectis caymanensis var. caymanensis

Magnoliales
There are 118 species, 19 subspecies, and six varieties in the order Magnoliales assessed as least concern.

Magnoliaceae

Species

Liriodendron tulipifera, yellow poplar
Magnolia acuminata, cucumber magnolia
Magnolia amazonica
Magnolia baillonii
Magnolia betongensis
Magnolia biondii
Magnolia campbellii, Campbell's magnolia
Magnolia carsonii
Magnolia cathcartii
Magnolia cavaleriei
Magnolia champaca, champak
Magnolia chapensis, prosperous music smiling tree
Magnolia citrata
Magnolia conifera
Magnolia dandyi
Magnolia delavayi
Magnolia denudata
Magnolia equatorialis
Magnolia figo, banana magnolia
Magnolia fordiana
Magnolia foveolata
Magnolia fraseri, Fraser's magnolia
Magnolia globosa
Magnolia grandiflora, southern magnolia
Magnolia guatemalensis
Magnolia hodgsonii
Magnolia insignis
Magnolia liliifera
Magnolia macclurei
Magnolia macrophylla, big-leaf magnolia
Magnolia martinii
Magnolia maudiae
Magnolia mediocris
Magnolia oblonga
Magnolia obovata, Japanese big leaf magnolia
Magnolia ovata
Magnolia panamensis
Magnolia persuaveolens
Magnolia rimachii
Magnolia sabahensis
Magnolia salicifolia, willow leafed magnolia
Magnolia siamensis
Magnolia sieboldii
Magnolia sprengeri
Magnolia sumatrana
Magnolia tripetala, umbrella magnolia
Magnolia virginiana, sweet bay

Subspecies
Magnolia persuaveolens subsp. rigida
Varieties
Magnolia carsonii var. carsonii
Magnolia fordiana var. fordiana

Annonaceae

Species

Alphonsea curtisii
Alphonsea maingayi
Artabotrys modestus
Cyathocalyx pahangensis
Cyathocalyx pruniferus
Cyathocalyx sumatranus
Cyathostemma vietnamense
Disepalum pulchrum
Drepananthus filiformis
Enicosanthellum petelotii
Enicosanthellum plagioneurum
Enicosanthum membranifolium
Fenerivia emarginata
Goniothalamus chinensis
Goniothalamus curtisii
Goniothalamus tenuifolius
Greenwayodendron suaveolens
Miliusa amplexicaulis
Mischogyne elliotianum
Monanthotaxis fornicata
Monanthotaxis trichocarpa
Orophea hastata
Polyalthia chrysotricha
Polyalthia hookeriana
Polyalthia hypogaea
Polyalthia lateritia
Polyalthia macropoda
Popowia fusca
Popowia perakensis
Rollinia fendleri
Sphaerocoryne gracilis
Trivalvaria nervosa
Unonopsis velutina
Uvaria acuminata
Uvaria leptocladon
Uvaria lucida
Uvaria sofa
Xylopia elliptica
Xylopia magna

Subspecies

Artabotrys modestus subsp. macranthus
Sphaerocoryne gracilis subsp. gracilis
Uvaria lucida subsp. lucida

Myristicaceae

Species

Horsfieldia grandis
Horsfieldia irya
Horsfieldia olens
Horsfieldia parviflora
Horsfieldia punctatifolia
Horsfieldia sylvestris
Horsfieldia wallichii
Horsfieldia whitmorei
Knema attenuata
Knema conferta
Knema elmeri
Knema furfuracea
Knema glaucescens
Knema globularia
Knema glomerata
Knema latifolia
Knema linguiformis
Knema malayana
Knema rubens
Knema scortechinii
Myristica cinnamomea
Myristica elliptica
Myristica gillespieana
Myristica grandifolia
Myristica guatteriifolia
Myristica guillauminiana
Myristica hollrungii
Myristica iners
Myristica kalkmanii
Myristica macrantha
Myristica maxima
Myristica sangowoensis

Subspecies

Endocomia macrocoma subsp. macrocoma
Knema kunstleri subsp. kunstleri
Knema latericia subsp. albifolia
Knema latericia subsp. ridleyi
Knema oblongata subsp. oblongata
Knema stenophylla subsp. longipedicellata
Knema stenophylla subsp. stenophylla
Myristica fatua subsp. fatua
Myristica fissiflora subsp. kostermansii
Myristica inutilis subsp. papuana
Myristica inutilis subsp. platyphylla
Myristica lancifolia subsp. lancifolia
Myristica lancifolia subsp. montana
Myristica tristis subsp. moluccana
Myristica tristis subsp. tristis

Varieties

Horsfieldia moluccana var. petiolaris
Knema laurina var. heteropilis
Knema laurina var. laurina
Myristica bialata var. brevipila

Capparales
There are 45 species in Capparales assessed as least concern.

Capparaceae
Cleome socotrana
Maerua andradae

Cruciferae

Alyssum dagestanicum, Dagestanian alyssum
Armoracia rusticana, horseradish
Barbarea balcana, Balkan yellow rocket
Barbarea integrifolia
Barbarea plantaginea
Barbarea rupicola
Barbarea vulgaris, herb barbaras
Boleum asperum
Brassica balearica
Brassica montana
Brassica nivalis
Cardamine bulbosa
Cardamine pensylvanica
Cardamine uliginosa
Crambe santosii
Crambe strigosa
Diplotaxis gomez-campoi
Diplotaxis ibicensis
Diplotaxis ilorcitana
Erucastrum rostratum
Eutrema edwardsii
Ionopsidium acaule
Isatis bungeana, Bunge's woad
Lepidium cardamines
Lepidium heterophyllum, Smith's pepperwort
Lepidium villarsii
Nasturtium officinale, watercress
Neobeckia aquatica
Rorippa amphibia, great yellow-cress
Rorippa aurea
Rorippa austriaca, Austrian field cress
Rorippa curvisiliqua
Rorippa islandica, marsh cress
Rorippa kerneri
Rorippa lippizensis
Rorippa microphylla, narrow-fruited water-cress
Rorippa sylvestris, creeping yellow cress
Schivereckia podolica
Sisymbrella aspera
Sisymbrium supinum
Subularia aquatica, awlwort

Resedaceae
Ochradenus socotranus
Reseda viridis

Apiales
There are 74 species and two subspecies in the order Apiales assessed as least concern.

Araliaceae

Species

Cheirodendron bastardianum
Cussonia zimmermannii
Oreopanax andreanus
Oreopanax ecuadorensis
Pentapanax leschenaultii
Plerandra crassipes
Plerandra gabriellae
Plerandra leptophylla
Plerandra osyana
Plerandra pancheri
Plerandra plerandroides
Plerandra reginae
Plerandra veilloniorum
Polyscias marchionensis
Polyscias verrucosa
Schefflera bractescens
Schefflera hullettii
Schefflera myriantha
Schefflera roxburghii
Schefflera seemanniana
Schefflera sprucei
Schefflera taiwaniana
Schefflera vitiensis

Subspecies
Plerandra osyana subsp. osyana
Plerandra osyana subsp. toto

Umbelliferae

Ammoides pusilla, cerfolium
Angelica atropurpurea
Angelica heterocarpa
Angelica sylvestris
Anginon streyi
Apium graveolens, wild celery
Apium inundatum, lesser marshwort
Apium nodiflorum, fool's-water-cress
Berula erecta, lesser water-parsnip
Bunium bulbocastanum, great pignut
Carum verticillatum
Centella asiatica, centella
Cicuta bulbifera
Cicuta douglasii
Cicuta maculata
Cicuta virosa, European waterhemlock
Eryngium corniculatum
Ferula communis, giant fennel
Heracleum cyclocarpum, cyclocarpous cow-parsnip
Heracleum freynianum, Freyn's cow-parsnip
Heracleum leskovii, Leskov's cow-parsnip
Heracleum mantegazzianum, Mantegazzi's cow-parsnip
Heracleum maximum
Heracleum schelkovnikovii, Shelkovnikov's cow-parsnip
Heracleum sommieri, Sommier's cow-parsnip
Heracleum trachyloma, downy cow-parsnip
Hydrocotyle americana
Hydrocotyle hitchcockii
Hydrocotyle javanica
Hydrocotyle ranunculoides
Hydrocotyle sibthorpioides
Hydrocotyle umbellata
Hydrocotyle vulgaris, marsh pennywort
Lilaeopsis occidentalis
Marlothiella gummifera
Oenanthe aquatica, fine-leaved water-dropwort
Oenanthe divaricata
Oenanthe fistulosa, tubular water-dropwort
Oenanthe globulosa
Oenanthe javanica, water dropwort
Oenanthe sarmentosa
Oenanthe silaifolia, narrow-leaved water-dropwort
Oxypolis occidentalis
Oxypolis rigidior
Petagnia saniculifolia
Peucedanum adae, Ada's hog's-fennel
Rughidia cordatum
Seseli petraeum, stone seseli
Seseli ponticum, pontic seseli
Sium sisaroideum
Sium suave

Gentianales
There are 79 species, two subspecies, and one variety in the order Gentianales assessed as least concern.

Apocynaceae

Species

Alstonia angustifolia
Alstonia macrophylla
Alstonia pneumatophora
Alstonia rupestris
Alstonia scholaris, blackboard tree
Alstonia spatulata, Alstonia spathulata
Dyera costulata
Holarrhena pubescens, bitter oleander
Nerium oleander, oleander
Pachypodium geayi
Stemmadenia tomentosa
Tabernaemontana corymbosa
Tabernaemontana panamensis
Tabernaemontana thurstonii
Vallesia glabra, pearlberry
Wrightia laevis

Subspecies
Adenium obesum subsp. sokotranum, desert rose
Wrightia pubescens subsp. lanitii
Varieties
Vallesia glabra var. pubescens

Loganiaceae

Geniostoma confertiflorum
Geniostoma quadrangulare
Geniostoma rapense
Geniostoma uninervium
Neuburgia collina
Strychnos mellodora

Asclepiadaceae

Asclepias exaltata
Asclepias incarnata
Australluma peschii
Baynesia lophophora
Brachystelma schinzii
Brachystelma schultzei
Ceropegia decidua
Ceropegia dinteri
Cryptolepis arbuscula
Cryptolepis intricata
Cynanchum acutum
Hoodia juttae
Hoodia ruschii
Hoodia triebneri
Huernia hallii
Huernia plowesii
Kanahia laniflora
Larryleachia tirasmontana
Lavrania haagnerae
Marsdenia obscura
Matelea rivularis
Oxystelma esculentum
Sarcostemma angustissimum, Galapagos sarcostemma
Secamone socotrana
Stapelia pearsonii
Tridentea pachyrrhiza
Vincetoxicum linifolium

Gentianaceae

Bartonia paniculata
Centaurium candelabrum
Centaurium erythraea, common centaury
Centaurium pulchellum, lesser centaury
Exacum affine
Exacum arabicum
Gentiana acaulis, stemless gentian
Gentiana douglasiana
Gentiana ligustica
Gentiana punctata, spotted gentian
Gentiana purpurea, purple gentian
Gentiana rubricaulis
Gentiana sceptrum
Gentianella cernua
Gentianella foliosa
Gentianella limoselloides
Gentianella rupicola
Gentianella splendens
Gentianopsis crinita
Gentianopsis detonsa
Gentianopsis virgata
Halenia longicaulis
Halenia pulchella
Hoppea dichotoma
Hoppea fastigiata
Lomatogonium rotatum
Sebaea microphylla
Sebaea pentandra
Swertia iberica
Swertia longifolia

Rosales
There are 89 species, one subspecies, and four varieties in the order Rosales assessed as least concern.

Pittosporaceae

Pittosporum pickeringii
Pittosporum rapense
Pittosporum rarotongense, Cook Islands pittosporum
Pittosporum rhytidocarpum
Pittosporum taitense

Cunoniaceae

Species

Spiraeanthemum katakata
Weinmannia affinis
Weinmannia rapensis
Weinmannia richii

Varieties

Geissois ternata var. glabrior
Geissois ternata var. ternata
Weinmannia parviflora var. marquesana
Weinmannia parviflora var. parviflora

Rosaceae

Species

Aflatunia ulmifolia
Alchemilla stricta
Alchemilla xanthochlora, lady's mantle
Amygdalus petunnikowi, Petunnikov almond
Comarum palustre
Cotoneaster morulus
Cotoneaster transcaucasicus
Crataegus azarolus, Mediterranean hawthorn
Crataegus korolkowi
Crataegus laevigata, midland hawthorn
Crataegus pontica
Filipendula ulmaria, meadowsweet
Geum bulgaricum
Geum rivale
Potentilla anserina
Potentilla diversifolia
Potentilla drummondii
Potentilla norvegica
Potentilla palustris
Potentilla rivalis
Potentilla supina
Prunus americana, American plum
Prunus arborea
Prunus besseyi, Besseyi cherry
Prunus cocomilia, Italian plum
Prunus emarginata, bitter cherry
Prunus fruticosa, European dwarf cherry
Prunus gracilis, Oklahoma plum
Prunus grisea
Prunus henryi
Prunus hortulana, hortulan plum
Prunus javanica
Prunus malayana
Prunus marsupialis
Prunus polystachya, bat laurel
Rosa acicularis
Rosa komarovii, Komarov's brier
Rosa palustris
Rosa pendulina
Rubus arcticus
Rubus chamaemorus
Rubus pedatus
Rubus pubescens
Sanguisorba officinalis, great burnet
Sorbus persica
Sorbus tianschanica
Sorbus wallichii

Subspecies
Sorbus aria subsp. lanifera

Saxifragaceae

Chrysosplenium americanum
Chrysosplenium tetrandrum
Saxifraga florulenta
Saxifraga foliolosa
Saxifraga hirculus, yellow marsh saxifrage
Saxifraga vayredana

Crassulaceae

Crassula aphylla
Crassula aurusbergensis
Crassula campestris
Crassula gemmifera
Crassula hedbergii
Crassula inanis
Crassula luederitzii
Crassula numaisensis
Crassula tillaea, mossy stonecrop
Crassula tuberella
Kalanchoe farinacea
Sempervivum marmoreum

Other Rosales species

Byblis aquatica
Byblis filifolia
Byblis liniflora
Byblis rorida
Grevea eggelingii
Licania splendens
Maranthes corymbosa
Parinari costata
Parnassia fimbriata
Parnassia glauca
Parnassia kotzebuei
Parnassia palustris, grass-of-Parnassus
Penthorum sedoides
Ribes glandulosum
Ribes janczewskii

Primulales
There are 37 species and two varieties in Primulales assessed as least concern.

Myrsinaceae

Species

Aegiceras corniculatum
Ardisia pulverulenta, blossomberry grape
Ardisia standleyana
Myrsine collina
Myrsine falcata
Myrsine fasciculata
Myrsine fusca
Myrsine niauensis
Myrsine nukuhivensis
Myrsine rapensis
Rapanea allenii

Varieties
Myrsine grantii var. grantii
Myrsine ovalis var. wilderi

Primulaceae

Anagallis serpens
Androsace cylindrica
Androsace pyrenaica
Cyclamen purpurascens
Hottonia palustris
Lysimachia ciliata
Lysimachia dubia
Lysimachia hybrida
Lysimachia maritima
Lysimachia nummularia, creeping-jenny
Lysimachia punctata
Lysimachia terrestris
Lysimachia thyrsiflora, tufted loosestrife
Lysimachia vulgaris, yellow loosestrife
Primula auriculata
Primula carniolica
Primula cuneifolia
Primula egaliksensis, Greenland primrose
Primula glaucescens
Primula incana
Primula mistassinica
Primula spectabilis
Primula stricta
Samolus porosus
Samolus valerandi, brookweed
Trientalis borealis

Rhamnales

Species

Alphitonia marquesensis
Cissus doeringii
Cissus hamaderohensis
Cissus paniculata
Cissus subaphylla
Cyphostemma bainesii
Cyphostemma juttae
Rhamnus × intermedia
Scutia spicata, thorn shrub
Vitis vinifera, wild grape
Ziziphus jujuba, jujube

Varieties
Scutia spicata var. pauciflora

Urticales
There are 38 species, three subspecies, and two varieties in Urticales assessed as least concern.

Urticaceae

Species

Boehmeria cylindrica
Pilea baurii, Galápagos dead nettle
Pilea fontana
Urtica dioica, common nettle

Varieties
Pipturus polynesicus var. polynesicus

Ulmaceae
Celtis caucasica
Trema discolor

Cecropiaceae
Cecropia obtusifolia

Moraceae

Species

Dorstenia hildebrandtii
Dorstenia tayloriana
Dorstenia variifolia
Dorstenia zanzibarica
Ficus albert-smithii
Ficus amazonica
Ficus broadwayi
Ficus carica, common fig
Ficus castellviana
Ficus catappifolia
Ficus dendrocida
Ficus greiffiana
Ficus hebetifolia
Ficus krukovii
Ficus lauretana
Ficus lingua
Ficus malacocarpa
Ficus mathewsii
Ficus matiziana
Ficus monckii
Ficus pallida
Ficus panurensis
Ficus schippii
Ficus schultesii
Ficus schumacheri
Ficus sphenophylla
Ficus tremula
Ficus trigonata
Ficus velutina
Helicostylis tomentosa
Maclura braziliensis

Subspecies

Brosimum alicastrum subsp. bolivarense
Ficus lingua subsp. depauperata
Ficus tremula subsp. tremula

Varieties
Dorstenia tayloriana var. laikipiensis

Cornales

Species

Alangium griffithi
Alangium javanicum
Alangium nobile
Cornus sericea
Mastixia arborea
Melanophylla alnifolia
Melanophylla crenata

Varieties
Mastixia trichotoma var. maingayi

Solanales
There are 48 species, one subspecies, and one variety in the order Solanales assessed as least concern.

Solanaceae

Species

Cestrum diurnum
Exodeconus miersii, Galapagos shore petunia
Lycium minimum, Galapagos lycium
Lycium sokotranum
Mandragora autumnalis, autumn mandrake
Nicotiana africana
Physalis galapagoensis
Solanum galapagense
Solanum minutifoliolum
Solanum paucijugum
Withania adunensis
Withania riebeckii

Subspecies
Solanum endopogon subsp. guianensis

Convolvulaceae

Species

Aniseia martinicensis, whitejacket
Calystegia sepium
Convolvulus grantii
Convolvulus hildebrandtii
Convolvulus sarmentosus
Cressa cretica
Cuscuta acuta
Cuscuta gronovii
Cuscuta gymnocarpa
Cuscuta kilimanjari
Ipomoea aquatica
Ipomoea coptica
Ipomoea habeliana, lava morning glory
Ipomoea linearifolia, arrow-leafed morning glory
Ipomoea passifloroides
Ipomoea prismatosyphon
Merremia gangetica, kidney leaf morning glory
Stictocardia tiliifolia

Varieties
Cuscuta kilimanjari var. major

Menyanthaceae

Fauria crista-galli
Menyanthes trifoliata, buckbean
Nymphoides aurantiaca
Nymphoides brevipedicellata
Nymphoides cordata
Nymphoides ezannoi
Nymphoides forbesiana
Nymphoides hydrophylla
Nymphoides indica, water-snowflake
Nymphoides parvifolia
Nymphoides peltata, fringed waterlily
Nymphoides rautanenii
Villarsia capensis

Hydrophyllaceae
Hydrolea zeylanica

Polemoniaceae

Navarretia leucocephala
Polemonium acutiflorum
Polemonium pulcherrimum
Polemonium viscosum

Scrophulariales
There are 277 species and 11 subspecies in the order Scrophulariales assessed as least concern.

Oleaceae

Chionanthus pubescens
Fraxinus profunda
Syringa reticulata

Gesneriaceae

Besleria comosa
Columnea tenensis
Cyrtandra anthropophagorum
Gesneria exserta
Haberlea rhodopensis
Ornithoboea barbanthera
Ornithoboea pseudoflexuosa
Paraboea divaricata
Paraboea gracillima
Paraboea incudicarpa
Paraboea subplana
Primulina drakei
Primulina gemella
Primulina halongensis
Primulina hiepii
Ramonda myconi, Pyrenean-violet
Ramonda serbica
Ridleyandra flammea
Streptocarpus caulescens
Streptocarpus hirsutissimus
Streptocarpus kirkii
Streptocarpus pallidiflorus
Streptocarpus saxorum

Bignoniaceae

Species

Deplanchea bancana
Dolichandrone spathacea
Tabebuia impetiginosa

Subspecies
Radermachera pinnata subsp. acuminata

Myoporaceae
Myoporum rapense

Acanthaceae

Species

Acanthopale laxiflora
Acanthopale macrocarpa
Acanthus ebracteatus, acanthus
Acanthus ilicifolius, holy mangrove
Acanthus montanus
Acanthus volubilis
Anisotes diversifolius
Anisotes dumosus
Anisotes macrophyllus
Anisotes parvifolius
Asystasia laticapsula
Asystasia macrophylla
Asystasia moorei
Asystasia richardsiae
Barleria aculeata
Barleria angustiloba
Barleria boranensis
Barleria diplotricha
Barleria granarii
Barleria hirtifructa
Barleria holstii
Barleria inclusa
Barleria kitchingii
Barleria masaiensis
Barleria neurophylla
Barleria nyasensis
Barleria paolioides
Barleria polhillii
Barleria robertsoniae
Barleria venenata
Barleria volkensii
Blepharis inopinata
Blepharis itigiensis
Blepharis longifolia
Blepharis panduriformis
Blepharis trispina
Brachystephanus holstii
Brillantaisia lamium
Brillantaisia owariensis
Brillantaisia soyauxii
Crossandra leucodonta
Crossandra pungens
Crossandra stenandrium
Crossandra tridentata
Crossandrella dusenii
Dicliptera albicaulis
Dicliptera brevispicata
Dicliptera effusa
Dicliptera elliotii
Dicliptera vollesenii
Dischistocalyx hirsutus
Duosperma grandiflorum
Duosperma kilimandscharicum
Duosperma longicalyx
Duosperma tanzaniense
Dyschoriste keniensis
Dyschoriste tanzaniensis
Dyschoriste thunbergiiflora
Ecbolium amplexicaule
Ecbolium madagascariense
Elytraria minor
Hygrophila abyssinica
Hygrophila auriculata
Hygrophila balsamica
Hygrophila difformis
Hygrophila gracillima
Hygrophila heinei
Hygrophila pinnatifida, miramar weed
Hygrophila polysperma, dwarf hygrophila
Hygrophila quadrivalvis
Hygrophila salicifolia
Hygrophila schulli
Hygrophila senegalensis
Hygrophila uliginosa
Hypoestes aristata
Hypoestes pubescens
Isoglossa ixodes
Isoglossa lactea
Isoglossa laxa
Isoglossa multinervis
Isoglossa paucinervis
Isoglossa substrobilina
Justicia acutifolia
Justicia afromontana
Justicia americana
Justicia brevipedunculata
Justicia bridsoniana
Justicia inaequifolia
Justicia interrupta
Justicia laxa
Justicia leikipiensis
Justicia lorata
Justicia microthyrsa
Justicia oblongifolia
Justicia pseudorungia
Justicia quinqueangularis
Justicia rigida
Justicia tricostata
Justicia udzungwaensis
Lankesteria alba
Megalochlamys tanzaniensis
Mendoncia cowanii
Mendoncia flagellaris
Mendoncia vinciflora
Mimulopsis kilimandscharica
Mimulopsis marronia
Monechma serotinum
Neuracanthus keniensis
Neuracanthus tephrophyllus
Phaulopsis angolana
Phaulopsis gediensis
Phaulopsis imbricata
Phaulopsis micrantha
Pseuderanthemum hookerianum
Rhinacanthus scoparius
Rhinacanthus virens
Ruellia currorii
Ruellia dioscoridis
Ruellia insignis
Ruellia primuloides
Sanchezia parviflora
Sanchezia sericea
Sclerochiton vogelii
Stenandrium guineense
Thomandersia hensii
Thomandersia laurifolia

Subspecies

Barleria polhillii subsp. nidus-avis
Barleria polhillii subsp. polhillii
Barleria polhillii subsp. turkanae
Duosperma longicalyx subsp. longicalyx
Dyschoriste keniensis subsp. keniensis
Isoglossa lactea subsp. lactea
Isoglossa lactea subsp. saccata
Isoglossa substrobilina subsp. substrobilina
Neuracanthus tephrophyllus subsp. conifer
Neuracanthus tephrophyllus subsp. tephrophyllus

Scrophulariaceae

Adenosma indianum
Bacopa floribunda
Bacopa hamiltoniana
Bacopa monnieri, water hyssop
Bacopa rotundifolia
Calceolaria aquatica
Calceolaria fothergillii, lady's slipper
Calceolaria hyssopifolia
Calceolaria rosmarinifolia
Calceolaria sericea
Castilleja minor
Castilleja nubigena
Centranthera indica
Centranthera tranquebarica
Chelone glabra
Curanga amara
Diclis tenuissima
Dopatrium junceum, rushlike dopatrium
Dopatrium longidens
Dopatrium nudicaule
Dopatrium senegalense
Euphrasia genargentea
Euphrasia hudsoniana
Glossostigma diandrum
Gratiola aurea
Gratiola ebracteata
Gratiola linifolia
Gratiola neglecta
Gratiola officinalis
Ilysanthes rotundifolia, baby's tears
Limnophila aromatica
Limnophila balsamea
Limnophila chinensis
Limnophila connata
Limnophila erecta
Limnophila geoffrayi
Limnophila glabra
Limnophila heterophylla
Limnophila indica, Indian marshweed
Limnophila laotica
Limnophila laxa
Limnophila micrantha
Limnophila polystachya
Limnophila repens
Limnophila rugosa
Limnophila sessiliflora
Limnophila villifera
Limosella acaulis
Limosella aquatica, water mudwort
Limosella inflata
Limosella macrantha
Limosella vesiculosa
Linaria algarviana
Linaria zangezura, Zangezurian toad-flax
Lindenbergia indica
Lindenbergia sokotrana
Microcarpaea minima, chickweed sparrow
Mimulus alatus
Mimulus alsinoides
Mimulus dentatus
Mimulus floribundus
Mimulus glabratus
Mimulus gracilis
Mimulus guttatus
Mimulus lewisii
Mimulus moschatus
Mimulus orbicularis
Mimulus ringens
Mimulus tilingii
Nemesia karasbergensis
Nemesia violiflora
Pedicularis groenlandica
Pedicularis labradorica
Pedicularis lanceolata
Pedicularis palustris
Pedicularis parviflora
Pedicularis sudetica
Scrophularia umbrosa
Selago lepida
Selago nachtigalii
Sibthorpia peregrina
Veronica americana
Veronica anagallis-aquatica, blue water-speedwell
Veronica anagalloides
Veronica beccabunga, brooklime
Veronica catenata, pink water-speedwell
Veronica nevadensis
Veronica peregrina
Veronica repens
Veronica scutellata, marsh speedwell
Veronica serpyllifolia
Xylocalyx aculeolatus
Xylocalyx asper

Lentibulariaceae

Pinguicula corsica
Pinguicula macroceras
Pinguicula reichenbachiana
Pinguicula villosa
Utricularia aurea
Utricularia australis, bladderwort
Utricularia bifida, bifid bladderwort
Utricularia cornuta
Utricularia foveolata
Utricularia geminiscapa
Utricularia gibba
Utricularia graminifolia
Utricularia intermedia
Utricularia lazulina
Utricularia microcalyx
Utricularia minor, lesser bladderwort
Utricularia ochroleuca
Utricularia purpurea
Utricularia radiata
Utricularia resupinata
Utricularia reticulata
Utricularia rigida
Utricularia sandersonii
Utricularia smithiana
Utricularia striatula
Utricularia subulata
Utricularia vulgaris, greater bladderwort

Pedaliaceae
Sesamothamnus leistneranus

Lamiales
There are 134 species, five subspecies, and two varieties in the order Lamiales assessed as least concern.

Verbenaceae

Species

Aegiphila cordifolia
Aegiphila sordida
Callicarpa maingayi
Coelocarpum socotranum
Lantana peduncularis, Galapagos lantana
Oxera pulchella
Phyla lanceolata
Phyla nodiflora, turkey tangle frogfruit
Premna protrusa
Premna tahitensis
Priva socotrana
Vitex longisepala
Volkameria aculeata, prickly myrtle

Subspecies
Oxera pulchella subsp. pulchella

Labiatae

Species

Ajuga oocephala
Clinopodium capitellatum
Clinopodium fasciculatum
Lavandula angustifolia, lavender
Lavandula latifolia, spike lavender
Lavandula nimmoi
Leucas kishenensis
Leucas spiculifera
Leucas usagarensis
Leucas virgata
Lycopus americanus
Lycopus asper
Lycopus europaeus, gypsywort
Lycopus rubellus
Lycopus uniflorus
Lycopus virginicus
Mentha aquatica, water mint
Mentha arvensis
Mentha insularis
Mentha longifolia, horse mint
Mentha pulegium, pennyroyal
Mentha requienii, Corsican mint
Mentha spicata, spearmint
Mentha suaveolens, round-leaved mint
Micromeria remota
Physostegia ledinghamii
Physostegia parviflora
Platostoma madagascariense
Plectranthus gibbosus
Plectranthus socotranus
Plectranthus vinaceus
Pogostemon salicifolius
Pogostemon stellatus
Pogostemon wightii
Prunella vulgaris, self-heal
Salvia canescens, hoary salvia
Salvia maximowicziana
Salvia officinalis, sage
Salvia quitensis
Scutellaria galericulata
Scutellaria lateriflora
Sideritis glacialis
Sideritis hyssopifolia, rock tea
Sideritis leucantha
Stachys fominii, Fomin's woundwort
Stachys lyallii
Stachys palustris, marsh woundwort
Stachys reptans
Stachys talyschensis, Talyshian woundwort
Tetradenia goudotii
Tetradenia nervosa
Teucrium balfourii
Teucrium betonicum
Teucrium eriocephalum
Teucrium socotranum
Thymus baeticus, Spanish lemon thyme
Thymus mastichina, Spanish marjoram
Thymus vulgaris, common thyme

Subspecies
Salvia officinalis subsp. lavandulifolia, Spanish sage

Boraginaceae

Species

Argusia argentea
Cordia alliodora, manjack
Cordia collococca, clammy cherry
Cordia laevigata, clam cherry
Cordia millenii, drum tree
Cordia sebestena, Geiger tree
Cordia subcordata
Cordia sulcata, white manjack
Cystostemon socotranus
Heliotropium balfourii
Heliotropium curassavicum
Heliotropium ovalifolium
Heliotropium socotranum
Myosotis debilis
Myosotis laxa, tufted forget-me-not
Myosotis secunda, creeping forget-me-not
Myosotis soleirolii
Myosotis welwitschii
Omphalodes littoralis
Pulmonaria officinalis, lungwort
Tiquilia darwinii
Tiquilia fusca
Tiquilia galapagoa
Tournefortia astrotricha
Tournefortia pubescens, white-haired tournefortia
Trichodesma laxiflorum
Trichodesma microcalyx
Varronia bahamensis
Varronia brittonii
Varronia brownei, black sage
Varronia bullata
Varronia lima
Varronia polycephala

Subspecies

Myosotis decumbens subsp. rifana
Varronia bullata subsp. bullata
Varronia bullata subsp. humilis

Varieties
Cordia sebestena var. sebestena
Tournefortia astrotricha var. astrotricha

Avicenniaceae

Avicennia alba
Avicennia germinans, black mangrove
Avicennia marina, gray mangrove
Avicennia officinalis
Avicennia schaueriana

Linderniaceae

Chamaegigas intrepidus
Lindernia anagallis
Lindernia antipoda
Lindernia bolusii
Lindernia ciliata, hairy slitwort
Lindernia crustacea
Lindernia diffusa
Lindernia dubia
Lindernia estaminodiosa
Lindernia hyssopoides
Lindernia micrantha
Lindernia mollis
Lindernia molluginoides
Lindernia monroi
Lindernia nummulariifolia, false pimpernel
Lindernia oppositifolia
Lindernia parviflora
Lindernia procumbens
Lindernia pusilla, tiny slitwort
Lindernia ruellioides, duckbill pimpernel
Lindernia tenuifolia
Lindernia viatica
Lindernia viscosa
Lindernia wilmsii
Torenia bicolor

Nepenthales
There are 35 species and two subspecies in Nepenthales assessed as least concern.

Nepenthaceae

Nepenthes alata
Nepenthes ampullaria
Nepenthes eustachya
Nepenthes gracilis
Nepenthes gymnamphora
Nepenthes lamii
Nepenthes leonardoi
Nepenthes mantalingajanensis
Nepenthes maxima
Nepenthes mirabilis
Nepenthes monticola
Nepenthes neoguineensis
Nepenthes nigra
Nepenthes papuana
Nepenthes pectinata
Nepenthes philippinensis
Nepenthes rafflesiana
Nepenthes reinwardtiana
Nepenthes rowaniae
Nepenthes stenophylla
Nepenthes tenax
Nepenthes tentaculata
Nepenthes tobaica
Nepenthes treubiana
Nepenthes vieillardii

Droseraceae

Drosera burmanni
Drosera filiformis
Drosera indica, Indian sundew
Drosera linearis
Drosera peltata
Drosera rotundifolia, common sundew

Sarraceniaceae

Species

Darlingtonia californica, California pitcher plant
Sarracenia flava
Sarracenia minor, hooded pitcherplant
Sarracenia psittacina

Subspecies
Sarracenia purpurea subsp. purpurea
Sarracenia purpurea subsp. venosa

Dilleniales

Hibbertia baudouinii
Hibbertia lanceolata
Hibbertia pancheri
Hibbertia patula
Hibbertia podocarpifolia
Hibbertia pulchella
Hibbertia trachyphylla
Hibbertia wagapii
Paeonia officinalis, common peony
Tetracera billardierei

Ranunculales
There are 51 species and one subspecies in the order Ranunculales assessed as least concern.

Berberidaceae
Berberis jamesonii
Berberis kaschgarica, Kashgar barberry

Menispermaceae
Cissampelos truncata
Tinospora oblongifolia

Ranunculaceae

Species

Aconitum coreanum
Aconitum napellus, aconite
Anemone halleri, Haller's anemone
Anemone koraiensis
Aquilegia alpina
Aquilegia bertolonii
Caltha leptosepala
Caltha natans
Caltha palustris
Helleborus purpurascens
Myosurus apetalus
Pulsatilla grandis, greater pasque flower
Pulsatilla vernalis, spring pasque flower
Ranunculus ambigens
Ranunculus aquatilis, common water-crowfoot
Ranunculus aurasiacus
Ranunculus baudotii, brackish water-crowfoot
Ranunculus breviscapus
Ranunculus cornutus
Ranunculus cymbalaria
Ranunculus dyris
Ranunculus flabellaris
Ranunculus flammula, lesser spearwort
Ranunculus fluitans, river water-crowfoot
Ranunculus gmelinii
Ranunculus granatensis
Ranunculus gusmannii
Ranunculus hederaceus, ivy-leaved crowfoot
Ranunculus hispidus
Ranunculus hyperboreus
Ranunculus lateriflorus
Ranunculus lingua, greater spearwort
Ranunculus lobbii
Ranunculus macounii
Ranunculus meyeri
Ranunculus multifidus
Ranunculus ophioglossifolius, adder's-tongue spearwort
Ranunculus peltatus, pond water-crowfoot
Ranunculus penicillatus, stream water-crowfoot
Ranunculus reptans, creeping spearwort
Ranunculus revelieri
Ranunculus rionii
Ranunculus saniculifolius
Ranunculus sceleratus, celery-leaved buttercup
Ranunculus sphaerospermus
Ranunculus trichophyllus, thread-leaved water-crowfoot
Trollius laxus

Subspecies
Aquilegia vulgaris subsp. ballii

Plantaginales

Littorella uniflora, shoreweed
Plantago bigelovii
Plantago cordata
Plantago eriopoda
Plantago longissima
Plantago macrocarpa
Plantago major, broadleaf plantain
Plantago maritima

Ericales
There are 16 species and two varieties in the order Ericales assessed as least concern.

Clethraceae
Clethra arborea

Ericaceae

Species

Andromeda polifolia
Chamaedaphne calyculata
Craibiodendron stellatum
Erica cinerea, bell heather
Gaultheria hispidula
Gaylussacia bigeloviana
Kalmia microphylla
Kalmia polifolia
Ledum palustre
Rhododendron ferrugineum, alpine rose
Rhododendron hirsutum, hairy alpenrose
Rhododendron wrayi
Vaccinium macrocarpon
Vaccinium oxycoccos
Vaccinium vitis-idaea, lingonberry

Varieties
Agarista mexicana var. pinetorum
Comarostaphylis discolor var. discolor

Polygonales

Koenigia islandica
Persicaria amphibia, amphibious bistort
Persicaria arifolia
Persicaria attenuata, smart weed
Persicaria barbata
Persicaria dichotoma
Persicaria glabrum
Persicaria hydropiper, water-pepper
Persicaria hydropiperoides
Persicaria lapathifolia
Persicaria maculosa
Persicaria robustior
Persicaria sagittata
Persicaria salicifolia
Persicaria senegalensis
Persicaria strigosa
Polygonum argyrocoleon
Polygonum plebeium
Polygonum pubescens
Polygonum punctatum
Polygonum romanum
Rumex britannica
Rumex hydrolapathum, water dock
Rumex occidentalis
Rumex palustris, marsh dock
Rumex tolimensis

Podostemales

Castelnavia fluitans
Castelnavia multipartita
Castelnavia princeps
Ceratolacis pedunculatum
Cipoia inserta
Cladopus hookeriana
Cladopus nymanii
Cladopus pierrei
Cladopus taiensis
Dalzellia zeylanica
Dicraeanthus africanus
Hydrobryopsis sessilis
Hydrobryum bifoliatum
Hydrobryum chiangmaiense
Hydrobryum griffithii
Hydrobryum japonicum
Hydrobryum loeicum
Hydrobryum micrantherum
Hydrodiscus koyamae
Indotristicha ramosissima
Ledermanniella ledermannii
Letestuella tisserantii
Paracladopus chiangmaiensis
Podostemum ceratophyllum
Podostemum ovatum
Podostemum scaturiginum
Polypleurum dichotomum
Polypleurum insulare
Polypleurum schmidtianum
Polypleurum stylosum
Polypleurum wallichii
Polypleurum wongprasertii
Sphaerothylax abyssinica
Sphaerothylax algiformis
Terniopsis brevis
Terniopsis malayana
Terniopsis minor
Thawatchaia trilobata
Zeylanidium barberi
Zeylanidium lichenoides
Zeylanidium olivaceum
Zeylanidium subulatum

Fabales

Species

Abarema cochliocarpos
Abarema commutata
Abarema curvicarpa
Abrus schimperi
Acacia amazonica
Acacia aneura, mulga
Acacia auriculiformis, ear-leaf acacia
Acacia basedowii, Basedow's wattle
Acacia bussei
Acacia caesia
Acacia chiapensis
Acacia crassiuscula
Acacia dempsteri
Acacia ehrenbergiana, salam
Acacia eremophila
Acacia excelsa, bunkerman
Acacia furcatispina
Acacia gilliesii
Acacia glaucocarpa
Acacia hecatophylla, long pod
Acacia hilliana, Hill's tabletop wattle
Acacia hydaspica
Acacia jennerae, coonavittra wattle
Acacia koa, koa
Acacia leucospira
Acacia montana, mallee wattle
Acacia pendula, weeping myall
Acacia permixta, hairy acacia
Acacia petraea, lancewood
Acacia piauhiensis
Acacia pluricapitata
Acacia richii
Acacia riparia
Acacia semirigida, Stony Ridge wattle
Acacia sericata
Acacia torrei
Acacia visco
Adenocarpus viscosus
Adenodolichos kaessneri
Adenolobus pechuelii
Adesmia aegiceras
Adesmia microphylla
Adesmia muricata
Adesmia papposa
Adesmia pungens
Adesmia trifoliolata
Adesmia trijuga
Aeschynomene aspera, sola pith plant
Aeschynomene brasiliana, Brazilian jointtvetch
Aeschynomene brevipes
Aeschynomene gracilis, Puerto Rico jointvetch
Aeschynomene indica, Indian jointvetch
Aeschynomene kerstingii
Aeschynomene marginata
Aeschynomene multicaulis
Aeschynomene racemosa
Aeschynomene tambacoundensis
Albizia adianthifolia, flat-crown albizia
Albizia bernieri
Albizia decandra
Albizia glabripetala
Albizia pistaciifolia
Albizia tulearensis
Alexa wachenheimii
Alysicarpus bupleurifolius
Alysicarpus naikianus
Amorpha californica, California indigobush
Anarthrophyllum rigidum
Andira fraxinifolia
Angylocalyx boutiqueanus
Anthonotha ferruginea
Aotus subglauca, wild wallflower
Arachis cardenasii
Archidendron ellipticum
Argyrolobium collinum
Argyrolobium sericosemium
Argyrolobium vaginiferum
Aspalathus bracteata
Aspalathus cinerascens
Aspalathus microphylla
Aspalathus salicifolia
Aspalathus serpens
Aspalathus tenuissima
Aspalathus triquetra
Aspalathus ulicina
Astragalus acaulis
Astragalus albispinus
Astragalus ammodendron
Astragalus arenarius, arenarious milk-vetch
Astragalus aucheri
Astragalus balfourianus
Astragalus bourgaeanus
Astragalus calycosus, King's milkvetch
Astragalus cephalotes
Astragalus cobrensis, copper mine milkvetch
Astragalus coltonii, Colton's milkvetch
Astragalus commixtus
Astragalus confusus
Astragalus cottamii, Cottam's milkbetch
Astragalus crassicarpus, groundplum milkvetch
Astragalus crenatus
Astragalus crotalariae, salton milkvetch
Astragalus denudatus
Astragalus didymocarpus, dwarf white milkvetch
Astragalus ensiformis, pagumpa milkvetch
Astragalus ervoides
Astragalus flexuosus, flexible milkvetch
Astragalus floccosus
Astragalus froedinii
Astragalus geminiflorus
Astragalus geyeri, Geyer's milkvetch
Astragalus kabristanicus, Kabristanian milk vetch
Astragalus kahiricus
Astragalus kolymensis
Astragalus koslovii
Astragalus lentiginosus, freckled milkvetch
Astragalus leontinus
Astragalus miser, timber milkvetch
Astragalus mollissimus, woolly locoweed
Astragalus molybdenus, Leadville milkvetch
Astragalus mongholicus
Astragalus myriacanthus
Astragalus nuttallianus, smallflowered milkvetch
Astragalus oophorus, egg milkvetch
Astragalus pachypus, thick-pod milkvetch
Astragalus pehuenches
Astragalus piutensis, Sevier milkvetch
Astragalus polycladus
Astragalus pubentissimus, green river milkvetch
Astragalus sesameus
Astragalus sogdianus
Astragalus sparsiflorus, Front Range milkvetch
Astragalus stevenianus
Astragalus submaculatus
Astragalus terminalis, railhead milkvetch
Astragalus tribuloides
Astragalus urgutinus
Astragalus whitneyi, balloonpod milkvetch
Astragalus williamsii, Williams' milkvetch
Astragalus wolgensis
Baphia buettneri
Baphia eriocalyx
Baphia nitida, camwood
Baptisia sphaerocarpa, round wild indigo
Bauhinia acuminata
Bauhinia beguinotii
Bauhinia cunninghamii, bean tree
Bauhinia cupreonitens
Bauhinia excelsa
Bauhinia finlaysoniana
Bauhinia forficata, orchid tree
Bauhinia glauca
Bauhinia harmsiana
Bauhinia hymenaeifolia
Bauhinia kockiana
Bauhinia ornata
Bauhinia picta
Bauhinia pottsii
Bauhinia purpurea, phanera purpurea
Bauhinia rufa
Bauhinia seleriana
Bauhinia stipularis
Bauhinia variegata, phanera variegata
Bauhinia wallichii
Bergeronia sericea
Berlinia coriacea
Bobgunnia fistuloides
Bocoa prouacensis
Bossiaea pulchella
Brachystegia angustistipulata
Brachystegia cynometroides
Brachystegia puberula
Brachystegia zenkeri
Brandzeia filicifolia
Brenierea insignis
Brongniartia lupinoides
Brongniartia mortonii
Bussea massaiensis
Caesalpinia hildebrandtii
Caesalpinia laxiflora
Caesalpinia merxmuelleriana
Caesalpinia sappan, sappan
Cajanus scarabaeoides
Calliandra hirsuta
Calliandra laxa
Calliandra macrocalyx
Calophaca wolgarica
Camoensia brevicalyx
Campylotropis trigonoclada
Canavalia hirsutissima
Canavalia macrobotrys
Canavalia sericea, silky jackbean
Caragana franchetiana
Caragana opulens
Caragana zahlbruckneri, pea shrub
Centrosema arenarium
Centrosema macrocarpum
Cercis canadensis
Cercis chinensis, Chinese redbud
Chaetocalyx scandens
Chamaecrista absus, tropical sensitive pea
Chamaecrista apoucouita
Chamaecrista ciliolata
Chamaecrista cotinifolia
Chamaecrista cytisoides
Chamaecrista desvauxii
Chamaecrista ensiformis
Chamaecrista fenarolii
Chamaecrista glandulosa
Chamaecrista jaegeri
Chamaecrista lineata
Chamaecrista newtonii
Chamaecrista nictitans, partridge-pea
Chamaecrista pedicellaris
Chamaecrista pratensis
Chamaecrista rigidifolia
Chamaecrista robynsiana
Chamaecrista rufa
Chamaecrista setosa
Chamaecrista trachycarpa
Chamaecrista viscosa
Chloroleucon mangense
Christia vespertilionis
Cicer echinospermum
Cicer oxyodon
Clathrotropis glaucophylla
Clitoria glaberrima
Clitoria hanceana
Clitoria kaessneri
Clitoria polystachya
Clitoria sagotii
Cojoba rufescens
Colvillea racemosa, Colville's glory
Copaifera langsdorffii
Coronilla valentina, Mediterranean crown vetch
Craibia grandiflora
Crotalaria albida
Crotalaria assamica
Crotalaria bamendae
Crotalaria bemba
Crotalaria capuronii
Crotalaria chrysochlora
Crotalaria cobalticola
Crotalaria cunninghamii, birdflower rattlepod
Crotalaria distantiflora
Crotalaria doidgeae
Crotalaria emarginata
Crotalaria eremaea, bluebush pea
Crotalaria fysonii
Crotalaria griseofusca
Crotalaria heidmannii
Crotalaria kipandensis
Crotalaria laburnoides
Crotalaria mahafalensis
Crotalaria melanocarpa
Crotalaria mendesii
Crotalaria micans
Crotalaria microthamnus
Crotalaria mildbraedii
Crotalaria montana
Crotalaria mortonii
Crotalaria morumbensis
Crotalaria nitens
Crotalaria nuda
Crotalaria paniculata
Crotalaria pumila, low rattlebox
Crotalaria quinquefolia
Crotalaria rotundifolia, prostrate rattlebox
Crotalaria rufocaulis
Crotalaria scabrella
Crotalaria somalensis
Crotalaria strigulosa
Crotalaria teretifolia
Crotalaria uncinella
Cullen americanum
Cullen badocanum
Cynometra commersoniana
Cynometra hankei
Cynometra insularis
Cynometra iripa
Cynometra marginata
Cytisus cantabricus
Cytisus jankae
Cytisus striatus
Dalbergia arbutifolia
Dalbergia assamica
Dalbergia calycina
Dalbergia cana
Dalbergia louisii
Dalbergia monetaria
Dalbergia oligophylla
Dalbergia ovata
Dalbergia parviflora
Dalbergia peltieri
Dalbergia reniformis
Dalbergia rimosa
Dalbergia trichocarpa
Dalea ayavacensis
Dalea bicolor, silver prairie-clover
Dalea compacta, compact prairie-clover
Dalea elegans
Dalea formosa, feather-plume dalea
Dalea lasiathera, purple prairie-clover
Dalea melantha
Dalea obovata, pussyfoot
Dalea obovatifolia
Dalea ornata, Blue Mountain prairie-clover
Dalea scandens
Daviesia croniniana
Daviesia gracilis
Daviesia nudiflora
Daviesia physodes, prickly bitter pea
Daviesia squarrosa
Decorsea dinteri
Deguelia scandens
Delonix boiviniana
Delonix brachycarpa
Delonix elata, white gul mohur
Delonix floribunda
Delonix regia, flame tree
Derris acuminata
Derris koolgibberah, poison rope
Derris maingayana
Desmanthus pumilus
Desmodium adscendens
Desmodium amethystinum
Desmodium barbatum
Desmodium elegans
Desmodium glutinosum, large tick-trefoil
Desmodium grahamii, Graham's tick-trefoil
Desmodium intortum
Desmodium lindheimeri, Lindheimer's tick-trefoil
Desmodium metallicum
Desmodium microphyllum
Desmodium nuttallii
Desmodium salicifolium
Desmodium vargasianum
Detarium microcarpum, sweet dattock
Dichrostachys arborescens
Dichrostachys cinerea, sicklebush
Dichrostachys spicata, Chinese lantern
Dillwynia juniperina, prickly parrot pea
Dioclea fimbriata
Dioclea guianensis
Dioclea sericea
Diphysa carthagenensis
Diphysa occidentalis
Diplotropis triloba
Disynstemon paullinioides
Dolichos elatus
Dolichos schweinfurthii
Dolichos trinervatus
Droogmansia pteropus
Dumasia villosa
Dunbaria fusca
Ebenopsis ebano, ebony blackbead
Echinospartum boissieri
Enterolobium schomburgkii
Eriosema crinitum, sand pea
Eriosema englerianum, blue bush
Eriosema harmsiana
Eriosema longicalyx
Eriosema raynaliorum
Erythrina burana
Erythrina madagascariensis
Erythrina senegalensis
Erythrina variegata, Indian coral tree
Etaballia dubia
Eurypetalum tessmannii
Eysenhardtia polystachya, kidneywood
Flemingia involucrata
Fordia albiflora
Gagnebina commersoniana
Galactia glaucescens
Galactia tenuiflora
Gastrolobium brevipes
Gastrolobium spinosum, prickly poison
Geissaspis cristata
Geissaspis tenella
Genista fasselata
Genista ferox
Genista maderensis
Genista pseudopilosa
Genista sagittalis
Genista tenera, Madeira broom
Genista tridentata
Geoffroea decorticans
Gilletiodendron mildbraedii
Gleditsia microphylla
Glycine canescens, silky glycine
Glycine latifolia
Glycyrrhiza lepidota
Gompholobium glabratum, dainty wedge pea
Gompholobium obcordatum
Gompholobium polyzygum
Gompholobium subulatum
Gompholobium viscidulum
Guibourtia ehie, black hyedua
Harpalyce arborescens
Hedysarum alpinum
Hedysarum falconeri
Hedysarum fruticosum, shrubby sweetvetch
Hedysarum polybotrys
Hippocrepis comosa, horseshoe-vetch
Hippocrepis monticola
Hippocrepis valentina
Hovea ramulosa
Hybosema ehrenbergii
Hymenaea courbaril
Hymenaea oblongifolia
Hymenaea parvifolia
Indigastrum guerranum
Indigofera angustata
Indigofera asperifolia
Indigofera baumiana
Indigofera bojeri
Indigofera brevidens, desert indigo
Indigofera breviviscosa
Indigofera bungeana
Indigofera caudata
Indigofera charlierana
Indigofera compressa
Indigofera conjugata
Indigofera daleoides
Indigofera depauperata
Indigofera elliotii
Indigofera exilis, slender indigo
Indigofera filicaulis
Indigofera filifolia
Indigofera filiformis
Indigofera galegoides
Indigofera hochstetteri
Indigofera hofmanniana
Indigofera intricata
Indigofera ionii
Indigofera kerstingii
Indigofera leucoclada
Indigofera linifolia
Indigofera marmorata
Indigofera melanadenia
Indigofera miniata, coastal indigo
Indigofera monophylla
Indigofera nephrocarpoides
Indigofera oblongifolia
Indigofera paracapitata
Indigofera polysphaera
Indigofera procumbens
Indigofera roseo-caerulea
Indigofera schliebenii
Indigofera sessiliflora
Indigofera taborensis
Indigofera trita
Indigofera venusta
Inga auristellae
Inga brachystachys
Inga densiflora
Inga jinicuil
Inga lomatophylla
Inga macrophylla
Inga marginata
Inga megaphylla
Inga micheliana
Inga multinervis
Inga polita
Inga psittacorum
Inga punctata
Inga sapindoides
Inga stipularis
Inga striata
Isoberlinia doka
Isotropis cuneifolia, granny bonnets
Jacksonia cupulifera
Jacksonia furcellata, grey stinkwood
Keyserlingia mollis
Kingiodendron platycarpum
Kotschya recurvifolia
Labichea rupestris
Lackeya multiflora, Boykin's clusterpea
Lathyrus cirrhosus, cirrhose vetch
Lathyrus grandiflorus, everlasting-pea
Lathyrus heterophyllus, Norfolk everlasting-pea
Lathyrus hirsutus, caley pea
Lathyrus multiceps
Lathyrus pallescens
Lathyrus palustris, marsh pea
Lathyrus rotundifolius, round-leaf vetchling
Lathyrus sphaericus
Lebeckia dinteri
Leobordea adpressa
Leobordea anthyllopsis
Leobordea mirabilis
Leonardoxa africana
Leptoderris brachyptera
Leptoderris glabrata
Lespedeza cuneata, Chinese bush-clover
Lespedeza floribunda
Lespedeza hirta, hairy bushclover
Libidibia glabrata
Liparia latifolia
Lonchocarpus caudatus
Lonchocarpus guatemalensis
Lonchocarpus minimiflorus
Lonchocarpus rugosus
Lotononis burchellii
Lotononis carnosa
Lotononis involucrata
Lotononis pachycarpa
Lotus aboriginus, thicket trefoil
Lotus arabicus
Lotus eriosolen
Lotus maroccanus
Lotus ononopsis
Lotus palustris
Lotus schimperi
Lotus tetragonolobus, winged pea
Lupinus argenteus, silver-stem lupine
Lupinus barkeri
Lupinus bogotensis
Lupinus breweri, Brewer's lupine
Lupinus diffusus, Oak Ridge lupine
Lupinus grayi, sierra lupine
Lupinus hispanicus
Lupinus kingii, King's lupine
Lupinus microcarpus, chick lupine
Lupinus nootkatensis, Nootka lupine
Lupinus obtusilobus, blunt-lobe lupine
Lupinus pubescens
Lupinus texensis, Texas bluebonnet
Lupinus variicolor, Lindley's varied lupine
Lysiloma acapulcense
Maackia amurensis, Amur maackia
Machaerium amplum
Machaerium brasiliense
Machaerium cirrhiferum
Machaerium ferox
Machaerium madeirense
Machaerium mutisii
Machaerium pilosum
Machaerium scleroxylon
Macrolobium acaciifolium
Macrolobium gracile
Macrolobium huberianum
Macrolobium limbatum
Macrolobium pendulum
Macrolobium suaveolens
Macroptilium bracteatum
Macrosamanea consanguinea
Macrosamanea pubiramea
Macrotyloma geocarpum
Maniltoa floribunda
Maniltoa minor
Marina orcuttii, Sonoran desert marina
Marina parryi, Parry's marina
Mecopus nidulans
Medicago astroites
Medicago bondevii
Medicago carstiensis
Medicago platycarpa
Medicago prostrata
Medicago secundiflora
Medicago tenoreana
Melilotus italicus, Italian melilot
Melolobium microphyllum
Microcharis microcharoides
Millettia acutiflora
Millettia bequaertii
Millettia borneensis
Millettia brachycarpa
Millettia glaucescens
Millettia hylobia
Millettia macroura
Millettia nitida
Millettia psilopetela
Millettia pulchra
Millettia richardiana
Millettia zechiana
Mimosa adenantheroides
Mimosa albida
Mimosa albolanata
Mimosa balansae
Mimosa bimucronata
Mimosa brachycarpa
Mimosa busseana
Mimosa claussenii
Mimosa cruenta
Mimosa dolens
Mimosa foliolosa
Mimosa furfuracea
Mimosa gracilis
Mimosa itatiaiensis
Mimosa modesta
Mimosa nuda
Mimosa paraguariae
Mimosa pilulifera
Mimosa pudica, sensitive plant
Mimosa revoluta
Mimosa savokaea
Mimosa wherryana, Wherry's mimosa
Mimosa xanthocentra
Monopteryx angustifolia
Mucuna bracteata
Mucuna canaliculata
Mucuna imbricata
Mucuna paniculata
Mucuna revoluta
Mundulea obovata
Mundulea stenophylla
Mundulea viridis
Neochevalierodendron stephanii
Neonotonia wightii, perennial soybean
Neptunia oleracea, water mimosa
Neptunia plena, dead and awake
Onobrychis kachetica, Kakhetian sainfoin
Onobrychis stenorhiza
Onobrychis viciifolia, sainfoin
Ononis antennata
Ononis euphrasiifolia
Ononis pinnata
Ononis tournefortii
Ormosia fastigiata
Ormosia flava
Ormosia macrodisca
Ormosia nobilis
Ormosia panamensis
Otholobium fruticans
Otholobium stachyerum
Oxyrhynchus volubilis, twining bluehood
Oxytropis ampullata
Oxytropis cachemiriana
Oxytropis falcata
Oxytropis floribunda
Oxytropis lambertii, purple locoweed
Oxytropis lanata
Paracalyx balfourii
Paraderris cuneifolia
Paraderris oblongifolia
Parkia balslevii
Parkia bicolor
Parkia ulei
Parochetus communis, blue oxalis
Pediomelum aromaticum, aromatic Indian breadroot
Periandra heterophylla
Periandra mediterranea, Brazilian licorice
Petalostylis labicheoides, butterfly bush
Phanera khasiana
Phaseolus polystachios, thicket bean
Phaseolus xanthotrichus
Philenoptera laxiflora
Phyllodium elegans
Phyllodium pulchellum
Physostigma cylindrospermum
Piscidia grandifolia
Pithecellobium diversifolium
Platymiscium dimorphandrum
Platypodium elegans
Podalyria myrtillifolia
Podolobium ilicifolium, prickly shaggy pea
Poiretia latifolia
Pomaria jamesii, James' caesalpinia
Pongamia pinnata
Pongamiopsis pervilleana
Prosopis kuntzei
Prosopis laevigata
Pseudovigna argentea
Psoralea esculenta, breadroot
Psorothamnus thompsoniae, Thompson's dalea
Pterocarpus brenanii
Pterocarpus lucens
Pterocarpus santalinoides
Pueraria alopecuroides
Pultenaea euchila, orange pultenaea
Pultenaea procumbens, heathy bush-pea
Pultenaea setulosa, Boorman's bush-pea
Pultenaea vestita, feather bush-pea
Rhynchosia argentea
Rhynchosia capensis
Rhynchosia diversifolia
Rhynchosia emarginata
Rhynchosia falconeri
Rhynchosia galpinii
Rhynchosia himalensis
Rhynchosia minima
Rhynchosia nelsonii
Rhynchosia pentheri
Rhynchosia pyramidalis
Rhynchosia senna
Rhynchosia totta
Rhynchotropis marginata
Robinia hispida, bristly locust
Robinia neomexicana, New Mexico locust
Robinia pseudoacacia, black locust
Samanea tubulosa
Schefflerodendron usambarense
Schotia afra, Karoo boer-bean
Senna artemisioides, burnt-leaved acacia
Senna baccarinii
Senna bicapsularis, Christmas bush
Senna ferraria, iron cassia
Senna foetidissima
Senna glutinosa, green acacia
Senna macranthera
Senna oxyphylla
Senna pendula
Senna rigida
Senna skinneri
Senna socotrana
Senna spectabilis
Senna tonduzii
Senna truncata
Senna viminea
Sesbania bispinosa
Sesbania brevipedunculata
Sesbania cannabina, canicha
Sesbania drummondii, Drummond's sesbania
Sesbania javanica
Sesbania macowaniana
Sesbania somalensis
Sesbania transvaalensis
Sindora siamensis
Smithia blanda
Smithia hirsuta
Smithia sensitiva
Sophora flavescens
Sophora nuttalliana, silky sophora
Spatholobus gyrocarpus
Spatholobus parviflorus
Spatholobus pottingeri
Sphaerolobium linophyllum
Sphaerophysa salsula, alkali swainsonpea
Strongylodon craveniae
Strongylodon madagascariensis
Stryphnodendron porcatum
Stylosanthes bracteata
Swainsona laxa, yellow darling pea
Swartzia amplifolia
Swartzia bombycina
Swartzia brachyrachis
Swartzia dolichopoda
Swartzia guatemalensis
Swartzia macrosema
Swartzia macrostachya
Swartzia panacoco
Swartzia picta
Swartzia remiger
Swartzia simplex
Swartzia tomentifera
Syrmatium tomentosum, Heermann's trefoil
Tachigali paniculata
Tadehagi rodgeri
Templetonia aculeata, spiny mallee pea
Tephrosia aequilata
Tephrosia aurantiaca
Tephrosia brachyodon
Tephrosia cephalantha
Tephrosia chimanimaniana
Tephrosia coccinea
Tephrosia cordatistipula
Tephrosia dura
Tephrosia eriocarpa
Tephrosia heterophylla
Tephrosia huillensis
Tephrosia marginella
Tephrosia odorata
Tephrosia onobrychoides, multi-bloom hoary-pea
Tephrosia paradoxa
Tephrosia tinctoria
Tephrosia villosa
Tessmannia africana
Tetragonolobus maritimus
Tetrapterocarpon geayi
Thermopsis montana, montane golden-banner
Trifolium africanum, Erasmus clover
Trifolium alpinum, alpine clover
Trifolium amabile, Aztec clover
Trifolium angustifolium, white clover
Trifolium bejariense, Bejar clover
Trifolium canescens, graying clover
Trifolium caucasicum, Caucasian clover
Trifolium ciliolatum, foothill clover
Trifolium clusii
Trifolium gymnocarpon, hollyleaf clover
Trifolium incarnatum, crimson clover
Trifolium masaiense
Trifolium obscurum
Trifolium parryi, Parry's clover
Trifolium patulum
Trifolium pratense, red clover
Trifolium riograndense, Rio Grande clover
Trifolium scabrum, rough clover
Trifolium schimperi
Trifolium subterraneum, subterranean clover
Trifolium wigginsii
Trigonella cylindracea
Trigonella fimbriata
Trigonella grandiflora
Ulex densus
Ulex europaeus, common gorse
Uraria picta
Vicia amoena, Cheder ebs
Vicia cretica
Vicia leucophaea, Mogollon vetch
Vicia lomensis
Vicia minutiflora, pygmy-flower vetch
Vicia oroboides
Vicia orobus, upright vetch
Vicia pisiformis, pale-flower vetch
Vicia tenuifolia, bramble vetch
Vigna dalzelliana
Vigna microsperma
Viguieranthus pervillei
Wiborgia fusca
Wiborgia tetraptera
Zapoteca formosa
Zollernia glabra
Zollernia paraensis
Zornia brevipes
Zornia pardina
Zygia ampla, jarendeua de sapo
Zygia englesingii
Zygocarpum caeruleum

Subspecies

Acacia hebeclada subsp. chobiensis
Mundulea sericea subsp. madagascariensis
Trifolium masaiense subsp. masaiense
Trifolium masaiense subsp. morotoense

Varieties

Albizia niopoides var. colombiana
Anadenanthera colubrina var. cebil, curupay
Cassia afrofistula var. patentipila
Macrotyloma uniflorum var. verrucosum
Peltophorum dasyrachis var. tonkinensis
Serianthes melanesica var. melanesica

Rhizophorales

Bruguiera cylindrica
Bruguiera exaristata
Bruguiera gymnorhiza, Oriental mangrove
Bruguiera parviflora, smallflower bruguiera
Bruguiera sexangula
Ceriops australis
Ceriops tagal
Ceriops zippeliana
Kandelia candel
Kandelia obovata
Pellacalyx saccardianus
Rhizophora apiculata
Rhizophora mangle, red mangrove
Rhizophora mucronata
Rhizophora racemosa
Rhizophora stylosa

Caryophyllales
There are 928 species and two subspecies in the order Caryophyllales assessed as least concern.

Caryophyllaceae

Cerastium arvense
Cerastium szowitsii, Szowitz's chickweed
Dianthus bicolor, bicolour pink
Dianthus marizii
Dianthus raddeanus, Radde's pink
Dianthus schemachensis, Shemakhian pink
Gypsophila capitata, capitate chalk plant
Polycarpaea balfourii
Polycarpaea caespitosa
Polycarpaea hayoides
Polycarpaea spicata
Silene longicilia
Silene vulgaris, bladder campion
Spergularia bocconei, Boccone's sandspurry
Spergularia marina, lesser sea-spurrey
Spergularia media
Spergularia tangerina
Stellaria calycantha
Stellaria humifusa
Stellaria recurvata

Amaranthaceae

Species

Aerva microphylla
Aerva revoluta
Alternanthera filifolia
Alternanthera sessilis, sessile joyweed
Amaranthus anderssonii
Amaranthus sclerantoides
Amaranthus tuberculatus
Centrostachys aquatica

Subspecies
Alternanthera filifolia subsp. filifolia

Nyctaginaceae

Commicarpus heimerlii
Commicarpus simonyi
Guapira myrtiflora
Pisonia floribunda, Galapagos pisonia

Chenopodiaceae

Axyris caucasica, Caucasian axyris
Chenopodium rubrum
Salicornia rubra
Sarcobatus vermiculatus
Suaeda salina

Portulacaceae

Montia chamissoi
Montia fontana, blinks
Montia parvifolia
Portulaca howellii, Galapagos purslane
Talinum portulacifolium

Illecebraceae
Haya obovata
Herniaria maritima

Cactus species

Acanthocereus tetragonus
Ariocarpus fissuratus, chautle-living rock
Ariocarpus retusus
Ariocarpus trigonus
Armatocereus cartwrightianus
Armatocereus godingianus
Armatocereus laetus
Armatocereus matucanensis
Armatocereus procerus
Armatocereus rauhii
Armatocereus riomajensis
Arrojadoa penicillata
Arrojadoa rhodantha
Arthrocereus rondonianus
Arthrocereus spinosissimus
Astrophytum capricorne
Astrophytum myriostigma
Austrocactus bertinii
Austrocylindropuntia floccosa
Austrocylindropuntia shaferi
Austrocylindropuntia subulata, Eve's pin
Austrocylindropuntia verschaffeltii
Austrocylindropuntia vestita
Aztekium ritteri
Bergerocactus emoryi, golden-spined cereus
Blossfeldia liliputana
Brachycereus nesioticus, lava cactus
Brasiliopuntia brasiliensis
Browningia hertlingiana
Browningia microsperma
Browningia pilleifera
Calymmanthium substerile
Carnegiea gigantea, saguaro
Castellanosia caineana
Cephalocereus apicicephalium
Cephalocereus columna-trajani
Cereus aethiops
Cereus albicaulis
Cereus bicolor
Cereus fernambucensis
Cereus hexagonus, lady of the night cactus
Cereus hildmannianus, hedge cactus
Cereus insularis
Cereus jamacaru
Cereus lamprospermus
Cereus lanosus
Cereus phatnospermus
Cereus repandus, apple cactus
Cereus spegazzinii
Cereus stenogonus
Cereus trigonodendron
Cipocereus minensis
Cipocereus pleurocarpus
Cleistocactus baumannii
Cleistocactus brookeae
Cleistocactus buchtienii
Cleistocactus candelilla
Cleistocactus fieldianus
Cleistocactus hyalacanthus
Cleistocactus icosagonus
Cleistocactus laniceps
Cleistocactus leonensis
Cleistocactus pachycladus
Cleistocactus parviflorus
Cleistocactus ritteri
Cleistocactus samaipatanus
Cleistocactus sepium
Cleistocactus smaragdiflorus
Cleistocactus strausii
Cleistocactus tenuiserpens
Cleistocactus tominensis
Coleocephalocereus aureus
Coleocephalocereus fluminensis
Consolea macracantha
Consolea millspaughii
Consolea moniliformis
Consolea nashii
Consolea rubescens
Copiapoa calderana
Copiapoa cinerea
Copiapoa coquimbana
Copiapoa dealbata
Copiapoa krainziana
Copiapoa longistaminea
Copiapoa montana
Corryocactus brevistylus
Corryocactus chachapoyensis
Corryocactus melanotrichus
Corynopuntia aggeria
Corynopuntia clavata
Corynopuntia emoryi
Corynopuntia grahamii
Corynopuntia invicta
Corynopuntia kunzei
Corynopuntia moelleri
Corynopuntia parishiorum, Parish's club-cholla
Corynopuntia pulchella, sand cholla
Corynopuntia schottii
Corynopuntia vilis
Coryphantha clavata
Coryphantha compacta
Coryphantha cornifera, rhinoceros cactus
Coryphantha delaetiana
Coryphantha delicata
Coryphantha difficilis
Coryphantha durangensis
Coryphantha echinoidea
Coryphantha echinus, cory-cactus hedgehog
Coryphantha elephantidens, elephant's tooth
Coryphantha erecta
Coryphantha georgii
Coryphantha glanduligera
Coryphantha glassii
Coryphantha gracilis
Coryphantha jalpanensis
Coryphantha longicornis
Coryphantha macromeris, nipple beehive cactus
Coryphantha neglecta
Coryphantha nickelsiae, Nickels' pincushion cactus
Coryphantha octacantha
Coryphantha ottonis
Coryphantha pallida
Coryphantha poselgeriana
Coryphantha pseudoechinus
Coryphantha pseudonickelsiae
Coryphantha ramillosa, bunched cory cactus
Coryphantha recurvata, recurved corycactus
Coryphantha robustispina, Pima pineapple cactus
Coryphantha salinensis
Coryphantha sulcata, finger cactus
Coryphantha tripugionacantha
Coryphantha vogtherriana
Coryphantha werdermannii
Coryphantha wohlschlageri
Cumarinia odorata
Cumulopuntia boliviana
Cumulopuntia chichensis
Cumulopuntia rossiana
Cumulopuntia sphaerica
Cylindropuntia abyssi, Peach Springs cholla
Cylindropuntia acanthocarpa
Cylindropuntia alcahes
Cylindropuntia arbuscula
Cylindropuntia bigelovii, teddy-bear cholla
Cylindropuntia californica, snake cholla
Cylindropuntia calmalliana
Cylindropuntia caribaea
Cylindropuntia cholla
Cylindropuntia davisii
Cylindropuntia delgadilloana
Cylindropuntia echinocarpa
Cylindropuntia fulgida, jumping cholla
Cylindropuntia ganderi
Cylindropuntia imbricata
Cylindropuntia kleiniae
Cylindropuntia leptocaulis, tesajo cactus
Cylindropuntia lindsayi
Cylindropuntia molesta
Cylindropuntia multigeniculata
Cylindropuntia munzii
Cylindropuntia prolifera
Cylindropuntia ramosissima
Cylindropuntia sanfelipensis
Cylindropuntia spinosior, cane cholla
Cylindropuntia tesajo
Cylindropuntia thurberi
Cylindropuntia tunicata
Cylindropuntia versicolor
Cylindropuntia whipplei
Cylindropuntia wolfii
Denmoza rhodacantha
Discocactus catingicola
Discocactus cephaliaciculosus
Discocactus placentiformis
Disocactus ackermannii
Disocactus macranthus
Disocactus nelsonii
Disocactus quezaltecus
Disocactus speciosus
Echinocactus horizonthalonius, Turk's-head cactus
Echinocactus polycephalus, cottontop cactus
Echinocactus texensis, horse crippler
Echinocereus acifer
Echinocereus adustus
Echinocereus arizonicus, Arizona hedgehog cactus
Echinocereus berlandieri, Berlandier's hedgehog cactus
Echinocereus bonkerae
Echinocereus brandegeei
Echinocereus bristolii
Echinocereus cinerascens
Echinocereus coccineus, scarlet hedgehog cactus
Echinocereus dasyacanthus, spiny hedgehog cactus
Echinocereus engelmannii, Engelmann's hedgehog cactus
Echinocereus enneacanthus, pitaya
Echinocereus fasciculatus
Echinocereus fendleri, Fendler's hedgehog cactus
Echinocereus ferreirianus
Echinocereus grandis, San Esteban hedgehog
Echinocereus knippelianus
Echinocereus laui
Echinocereus ledingii, Leding's hedgehog cactus
Echinocereus longisetus
Echinocereus nicholii, Nichol's hedgehog cactus
Echinocereus pacificus
Echinocereus palmeri
Echinocereus pamanesiorum
Echinocereus papillosus, allicoche hedgehog cactus
Echinocereus parkeri
Echinocereus pectinatus, órgano-pequeño peine
Echinocereus pensilis
Echinocereus pentalophus, lady-finger hedgehog cactus
Echinocereus polyacanthus
Echinocereus poselgeri, dahlia apple cactus
Echinocereus primolanatus
Echinocereus pseudopectinatus, devil-thorn
Echinocereus rayonesensis
Echinocereus reichenbachii, Reichenbach's hedgehog cactus
Echinocereus rigidissimus, Arizona rainbow cactus
Echinocereus russanthus, rusty hedgehog cactus
Echinocereus santaritensis
Echinocereus scheeri
Echinocereus scopulorum
Echinocereus spinigemmatus
Echinocereus stoloniferus
Echinocereus stramineus, strawberry hedgehog cactus
Echinocereus triglochidiatus, mound hedgehog cactus
Echinocereus viereckii
Echinocereus viridiflorus, green-flower hedgehog cactus
Echinopsis arachnacantha
Echinopsis aurea
Echinopsis breviflora
Echinopsis bridgesii
Echinopsis calochlora
Echinopsis calorubra
Echinopsis camarguensis
Echinopsis candicans
Echinopsis chiloensis
Echinopsis chrysochete
Echinopsis cinnabarina
Echinopsis cuzcoensis
Echinopsis densispina
Echinopsis deserticola
Echinopsis ferox
Echinopsis formosa
Echinopsis haematacantha
Echinopsis huascha
Echinopsis jajoana
Echinopsis lageniformis
Echinopsis lateritia
Echinopsis leucantha
Echinopsis mamillosa
Echinopsis marsoneri
Echinopsis maximiliana
Echinopsis mirabilis
Echinopsis obrepanda
Echinopsis oxygona
Echinopsis pachanoi, San Pedro cactus
Echinopsis pamparuizii
Echinopsis pentlandii
Echinopsis peruviana
Echinopsis pugionacantha
Echinopsis quadratiumbonata
Echinopsis rhodotricha
Echinopsis rojasii
Echinopsis rowleyi
Echinopsis saltensis
Echinopsis schickendantzii
Echinopsis schieliana
Echinopsis spiniflora
Echinopsis stilowiana
Echinopsis strigosa
Echinopsis tacaquirensis
Echinopsis tarijensis
Echinopsis tegeleriana
Echinopsis thionantha
Echinopsis tiegeliana
Echinopsis tunariensis
Echinopsis volliana
Echinopsis werdermanniana
Echinopsis yuquina
Epiphyllum anguliger, fishbone cactus
Epiphyllum cartagense
Epiphyllum crenatum
Epiphyllum hookeri, nightblooming cactus
Epiphyllum oxypetalum, Dutchman's pipe cactus
Epiphyllum phyllanthus, climbing cactus
Epiphyllum pumilum
Epiphyllum thomasianum
Epithelantha bokei, Boke's button cactus
Epithelantha micromeris, button cactus
Eriosyce aurata
Eriosyce bulbocalyx
Eriosyce curvispina
Eriosyce engleri
Eriosyce eriosyzoides
Eriosyce garaventae
Eriosyce heinrichiana
Eriosyce megliolii
Eriosyce paucicostata
Eriosyce strausiana
Eriosyce subgibbosa
Eriosyce villicumensis
Eriosyce villosa
Escobaria alversonii, cushion fox-tail cactus
Escobaria chihuahuensis
Escobaria dasyacantha, Big Bend foxtail cactus
Escobaria duncanii
Escobaria emskoetteriana, Robert's foxtail cactus
Escobaria hesteri, Hester's cory cactus
Escobaria minima, birdfoot cactus
Escobaria missouriensis, Missouri foxtail cactus
Escobaria sneedii, carpet foxtail cactus
Escobaria tuberculosa, corncob cactus
Escobaria vivipara, pincushion cactus
Escontria chiotilla
Espostoa blossfeldiorum
Espostoa calva
Espostoa hylaea
Espostoa lanata, cotton ball cactus
Espostoa melanostele
Espostoa mirabilis
Espostoa senilis
Espostoa utcubambensis
Eulychnia acida
Eulychnia breviflora
Eulychnia castanea
Eulychnia iquiquensis
Facheiroa squamosa
Facheiroa ulei
Ferocactus cylindraceus, California barrel cactus
Ferocactus diguetii
Ferocactus echidne
Ferocactus emoryi, Emory's barrel cactus
Ferocactus glaucescens
Ferocactus gracilis
Ferocactus hamatacanthus, biznaga-de-limilla
Ferocactus johnstonianus
Ferocactus latispinus
Ferocactus lindsayi
Ferocactus peninsulae
Ferocactus pilosus
Ferocactus viridescens, San Diego barrel cactus
Frailea castanea
Frailea pumila
Frailea pygmaea
Grusonia bradtiana
Gymnocalycium andreae
Gymnocalycium anisitsii
Gymnocalycium baldianum
Gymnocalycium bayrianum
Gymnocalycium berchtii
Gymnocalycium bodenbenderianum
Gymnocalycium bruchii
Gymnocalycium calochlorum
Gymnocalycium capillaense
Gymnocalycium castellanosii
Gymnocalycium erinaceum
Gymnocalycium eurypleurum
Gymnocalycium gibbosum
Gymnocalycium glaucum
Gymnocalycium hossei
Gymnocalycium hyptiacanthum
Gymnocalycium kieslingii
Gymnocalycium kroenleinii
Gymnocalycium marsoneri
Gymnocalycium mesopotamicum
Gymnocalycium mihanovichii
Gymnocalycium monvillei
Gymnocalycium mostii
Gymnocalycium nigriareolatum
Gymnocalycium ochoterenae
Gymnocalycium pflanzii
Gymnocalycium pugionacanthum
Gymnocalycium reductum
Gymnocalycium rhodantherum
Gymnocalycium ritterianum
Gymnocalycium robustum
Gymnocalycium saglionis
Gymnocalycium schickendantzii
Gymnocalycium schroederianum
Gymnocalycium spegazzinii
Gymnocalycium stellatum
Gymnocalycium stenopleurum
Gymnocalycium striglianum
Gymnocalycium taningaense
Gymnocalycium uebelmannianum
Haageocereus acranthus
Haageocereus chilensis
Haageocereus decumbens
Haageocereus platinospinus
Haageocereus pseudomelanostele
Haageocereus pseudoversicolor
Haageocereus versicolor
Harrisia adscendens
Harrisia balansae
Harrisia eriophora, fragrant prickly apple
Harrisia gracilis
Harrisia martinii
Harrisia pomanensis
Harrisia regelii
Harrisia tetracantha
Harrisia tortuosa
Hatiora salicornioides
Hylocereus costaricensis, Costa Rica nightblooming cactus
Jasminocereus thouarsii, candelabra cactus
Lasiocereus fulvus
Lasiocereus rupicola
Leocereus bahiensis
Lepismium cruciforme
Lepismium houlletianum
Lepismium incachacanum
Lepismium lorentzianum
Lepismium lumbricoides
Lepismium warmingianum
Leptocereus assurgens
Leptocereus weingartianus
Leuchtenbergia principis
Leuenbergeria bleo, syn. Pereskia bleo
Leuenbergeria guamacho, syn. Pereskia guamacho
Leuenbergeria lychnidiflora, syn. Pereskia lychnidiflora
Maihuenia patagonica
Maihuenia poeppigii
Maihueniopsis conoidea
Maihueniopsis darwinii
Maihueniopsis glomerata
Maihueniopsis hypogaea
Maihueniopsis subterranea
Mammillaria albicans
Mammillaria albilanata
Mammillaria barbata, greenflower nipple cactus
Mammillaria baumii
Mammillaria beneckei
Mammillaria bocasana
Mammillaria brandegeei
Mammillaria carnea
Mammillaria cerralboa
Mammillaria columbiana
Mammillaria compressa
Mammillaria crinita
Mammillaria decipiens
Mammillaria densispina
Mammillaria dioica
Mammillaria discolor
Mammillaria dixanthocentron
Mammillaria elongata
Mammillaria erythrosperma
Mammillaria evermanniana
Mammillaria fittkaui
Mammillaria formosa
Mammillaria geminispina
Mammillaria glassii
Mammillaria grahamii, Graham's pincushion cactus
Mammillaria grusonii
Mammillaria guelzowiana
Mammillaria guerreronis
Mammillaria haageana
Mammillaria heyderi, little nipple cactus
Mammillaria huitzilopochtli
Mammillaria hutchisoniana
Mammillaria insularis
Mammillaria karwinskiana
Mammillaria klissingiana
Mammillaria kraehenbuehlii
Mammillaria lasiacantha, lace-spine nipple cactus
Mammillaria lenta
Mammillaria longiflora
Mammillaria magnimamma
Mammillaria mainiae, Main's nipple-cactus
Mammillaria mammillaris
Mammillaria marksiana
Mammillaria mazatlanensis
Mammillaria melanocentra
Mammillaria mercadensis
Mammillaria moelleriana
Mammillaria muehlenpfordtii
Mammillaria mystax
Mammillaria nana
Mammillaria neopalmeri
Mammillaria nivosa, woolly nipple cactus
Mammillaria nunezii
Mammillaria orcuttii
Mammillaria petterssonii
Mammillaria phitauiana
Mammillaria picta
Mammillaria pilispina
Mammillaria polyedra
Mammillaria polythele
Mammillaria pondii
Mammillaria poselgeri
Mammillaria pottsii, Pott's nipple-cactus
Mammillaria prolifera, West Indian nipple-cactus
Mammillaria rekoi
Mammillaria rhodantha
Mammillaria saboae
Mammillaria sartorii
Mammillaria scrippsiana
Mammillaria sempervivi
Mammillaria senilis
Mammillaria sphacelata
Mammillaria sphaerica, pale mammillaria
Mammillaria standleyi
Mammillaria tetrancistra, southwestern prickly-pear
Mammillaria thornberi, Thornber's fishhook cactus
Mammillaria tonalensis
Mammillaria uncinata
Mammillaria vetula
Mammillaria weingartiana
Mammillaria winterae
Mammillaria wrightii, Wright's prickly-pear
Mammillaria zephyranthoides
Mammilloydia candida
Matucana aurantiaca
Matucana formosa
Matucana haynei
Melocactus bahiensis
Melocactus concinnus
Melocactus curvispinus
Melocactus ernestii
Melocactus harlowii
Melocactus inconcinnus
Melocactus intortus, mother-in-law's pincushion
Melocactus levitestatus
Melocactus macracanthos
Melocactus mazelianus
Melocactus neryi
Melocactus oreas
Melocactus paucispinus
Melocactus peruvianus
Melocactus smithii
Melocactus zehntneri
Micranthocereus purpureus
Miqueliopuntia miquelii
Myrtillocactus cochal
Myrtillocactus geometrizans
Myrtillocactus schenckii
Neobuxbaumia macrocephala
Neobuxbaumia mezcalaensis
Neobuxbaumia scoparia
Neobuxbaumia squamulosa
Neobuxbaumia tetetzo
Neolloydia conoidea
Neoraimondia arequipensis
Neoraimondia herzogiana
Neowerdermannia chilensis
Neowerdermannia vorwerkii
Nopalea auberi
Nopalea inaperta
Opuntia ammophila
Opuntia anacantha
Opuntia arechavaletae
Opuntia assumptionis
Opuntia atrispina, border prickly-pear
Opuntia aurantiaca, tiger-pear
Opuntia aurea, golden prickly-pear
Opuntia aureispina, golden-spined prickly-pear
Opuntia austrina
Opuntia basilaris, beavertail prickly-pear
Opuntia boldinghii
Opuntia bravoana
Opuntia caracassana
Opuntia chlorotica, dollar-joint prickly-pear
Opuntia decumbens
Opuntia depressa
Opuntia elata
Opuntia elatior
Opuntia engelmannii, cactus-apple
Opuntia excelsa
Opuntia fragilis, brittle prickly-pear
Opuntia fuliginosa
Opuntia galapageia, Galápagos prickly pear
Opuntia gosseliniana, violet prickly-pear
Opuntia guatemalensis
Opuntia huajuapensis
Opuntia humifusa, eastern prickly-pear
Opuntia hyptiacantha
Opuntia lagunae
Opuntia lasiacantha
Opuntia lata
Opuntia leucotricha, arborescent pricklypear
Opuntia littoralis, coastal prickly-pear
Opuntia macrocentra, purple prickly-pear
Opuntia macrorhiza, twistspine pricklypear
Opuntia megapotamica
Opuntia microdasys
Opuntia monacantha, common pricklypear
Opuntia oricola, chaparral prickly-pear
Opuntia parviclada
Opuntia phaeacantha, New Mexico prickly-pear
Opuntia pilifera
Opuntia pinkavae, Bulrush Canyon prickly-pear
Opuntia pollardii
Opuntia polyacantha, panhandle prickly-pear
Opuntia pottsii
Opuntia puberula
Opuntia pubescens
Opuntia pusilla, cockspur pricklypear
Opuntia pycnantha
Opuntia quimilo
Opuntia quitensis
Opuntia repens, roving pricklypear
Opuntia robusta
Opuntia rufida, blind pricklypear
Opuntia salmiana
Opuntia schickendantzii
Opuntia soederstromiana
Opuntia stenopetala
Opuntia streptacantha
Opuntia stricta, erect pricklypear
Opuntia strigil, marble-fruit prickly-pear
Opuntia sulphurea
Opuntia tehuacana
Opuntia tehuantepecana
Opuntia tomentosa, woollyjoint pricklypear
Opuntia wilcoxii
Oreocereus celsianus
Oreocereus doelzianus
Oreocereus hempelianus
Oreocereus leucotrichus
Oreocereus trollii
Oroya borchersii
Pachycereus fulviceps
Pachycereus hollianus
Pachycereus pecten-aboriginum
Pachycereus pringlei
Pachycereus schottii, senita cactus
Pachycereus tepamo
Pachycereus weberi
Parodia ayopayana
Parodia carambeiensis
Parodia chrysacanthion
Parodia comarapana
Parodia commutans
Parodia erinacea
Parodia formosa
Parodia gibbulosoides
Parodia linkii
Parodia maassii
Parodia mammulosa
Parodia microsperma
Parodia ocampoi
Parodia otaviana
Parodia prestoensis
Parodia ritteri
Parodia schwebsiana
Parodia stuemeri
Parodia subterranea
Parodia taratensis
Parodia tuberculata
Parodia turbinata
Pediocactus nigrispinus
Pediocactus peeblesianus, Peebles' Navajo cactus
Pediocactus sileri, Siler's pincushion cactus
Pediocactus simpsonii, snowball pediocactus
Pediocactus winkleri, Winkler's pincushion cactus
Pelecyphora aselliformis
Pelecyphora strobiliformis
Peniocereus greggii, desert night-blooming cereus
Peniocereus hirschtianus
Peniocereus johnstonii
Peniocereus marianus
Peniocereus serpentinus
Peniocereus striatus, gearstem cactus
Peniocereus viperinus
Pereskia aculeata, Barbados gooseberry
Pereskia diaz-romeroana
Pereskia horrida
Pereskia weberiana
Pereskiopsis aquosa
Pereskiopsis blakeana
Pereskiopsis diguetii
Pereskiopsis kellermanii
Pereskiopsis porteri
Pereskiopsis rotundifolia
Pfeiffera ianthothele
Pfeiffera monacantha
Pfeiffera paranganiensis
Pierrebraunia brauniorum
Pilosocereus alensis
Pilosocereus aurisetus
Pilosocereus bohlei
Pilosocereus brasiliensis
Pilosocereus catingicola
Pilosocereus chrysacanthus
Pilosocereus collinsii
Pilosocereus flavipulvinatus
Pilosocereus floccosus
Pilosocereus gaumeri
Pilosocereus glaucochrous
Pilosocereus gounellei
Pilosocereus jauruensis
Pilosocereus lanuginosus
Pilosocereus leucocephalus
Pilosocereus machrisii
Pilosocereus pachycladus
Pilosocereus pentaedrophorus
Pilosocereus piauhyensis
Pilosocereus polygonus, Key tree cactus
Pilosocereus purpusii
Pilosocereus pusillibaccatus
Pilosocereus royenii, Royen's tree cactus
Pilosocereus tuberculatus
Pilosocereus vilaboensis
Polaskia chende
Polaskia chichipe
Praecereus euchlorus
Praecereus saxicola
Pseudorhipsalis amazonica
Pseudorhipsalis ramulosa, syn. Kimnachia ramulosa
Pterocactus araucanus
Pterocactus australis
Pterocactus fischeri
Pterocactus gonjianii
Pterocactus hickenii
Pterocactus megliolii
Pterocactus reticulatus
Pterocactus tuberosus
Pterocactus valentinii
Quiabentia verticillata
Quiabentia zehntneri
Rauhocereus riosaniensis
Rebutia breviflora
Rebutia canigueralii
Rebutia cardenasiana
Rebutia cintia
Rebutia cylindrica
Rebutia deminuta
Rebutia einsteinii
Rebutia fabrisii
Rebutia fidana
Rebutia fiebrigii
Rebutia heliosa
Rebutia mentosa
Rebutia minuscula
Rebutia neocumingii
Rebutia oligacantha
Rebutia padcayensis
Rebutia pulchra
Rebutia pygmaea
Rebutia ritteri
Rebutia steinbachii
Rebutia steinmannii
Rebutia tarijensis
Rhipsalis baccifera, mistletoe cactus
Rhipsalis burchellii
Rhipsalis campos-portoana
Rhipsalis cereuscula
Rhipsalis cuneata
Rhipsalis elliptica
Rhipsalis floccosa
Rhipsalis grandiflora
Rhipsalis juengeri
Rhipsalis lindbergiana
Rhipsalis micrantha
Rhipsalis neves-armondii
Rhipsalis occidentalis
Rhipsalis pachyptera
Rhipsalis paradoxa
Rhipsalis pulchra
Rhipsalis puniceodiscus
Rhipsalis teres
Rhipsalis trigona
Rhodocactus bahiensis, syn. Pereskia bahiensis
Rhodocactus grandifolius, syn. Pereskia grandifolia; rose cactus
Rhodocactus nemorosus, syn. Pereskia nemorosa
Rhodocactus sacharosa, syn. Pereskia sacharosa
Rhodocactus stenanthus, syn. Pereskia stenantha
Samaipaticereus corroanus
Selenicereus guatemalensis (syn. Hylocereus guatemalensis)
Selenicereus megalanthus (syn. Hylocereus megalanthus)
Selenicereus monacanthus (syn. Hylocereus monacanthus)
Selenicereus ocamponis (syn. Hylocereus ocamponis)
Selenicereus setaceus (syn. Hylocereus setaceus)
Selenicereus triangularis (syn. Hylocereus triangularis)
Sclerocactus brevihamatus, Engelmann's fishhook cactus
Sclerocactus erectocentrus, red-spine butterfly-cactus
Sclerocactus glaucus, Colorado hookless cactus
Sclerocactus intertextus, white fishhook cactus
Sclerocactus johnsonii, eight-spine fishhook cactus
Sclerocactus mariposensis, Lloyd's mariposa cactus
Sclerocactus mesae-verdae, Mesa Verde cactus
Sclerocactus papyracanthus, grama grass cactus
Sclerocactus parviflorus, small-flower fishhook cactus
Sclerocactus polyancistrus, Mohave fishhook cactus
Sclerocactus pubispinus, Great Basin fishhook cactus
Sclerocactus scheeri, Scheer's fish-hook cactus
Sclerocactus spinosior, Desert Valley fishhook cactus
Sclerocactus uncinatus, Chihuahuan fish-hook cactus
Sclerocactus unguispinus
Sclerocactus warnockii, Warnock's fishhook cactus
Sclerocactus wetlandicus, Uinta Basin hookless cactus
Sclerocactus whipplei, Whipple's fishhook cactus
Selenicereus anthonyanus
Selenicereus grandiflorus
Selenicereus hamatus
Selenicereus inermis
Selenicereus spinulosus, vinelike moonlight cactus
Selenicereus vagans
Selenicereus validus
Siccobaccatus estevesii
Stenocactus coptonogonus
Stenocereus aragonii
Stenocereus dumortieri
Stenocereus eruca
Stenocereus fimbriatus
Stenocereus fricii
Stenocereus griseus
Stenocereus gummosus
Stenocereus kerberi
Stenocereus montanus
Stenocereus pruinosus
Stenocereus queretaroensis
Stenocereus quevedonis
Stenocereus standleyi
Stenocereus stellatus
Stenocereus thurberi, organ pipe cactus
Stenocereus treleasei
Stephanocereus leucostele
Stephanocereus luetzelburgii
Stetsonia coryne
Strophocactus testudo
Strophocactus wittii
Tacinga funalis
Tacinga inamoena
Tacinga palmadora
Tacinga saxatilis
Tacinga werneri
Tephrocactus alexanderi
Tephrocactus aoracanthus
Tephrocactus articulatus
Tephrocactus molinensis
Tephrocactus nigrispinus
Tephrocactus weberi
Thelocactus bicolor, straw thelocactus
Thelocactus buekii
Thelocactus conothelos
Thelocactus hexaedrophorus
Thelocactus leucacanthus
Thelocactus multicephalus
Thelocactus rinconensis
Thelocactus setispinus, miniature barrel cactus
Thelocactus tulensis
Tunilla corrugata
Tunilla soehrensii
Tunilla tilcarensis
Turbinicarpus beguinii
Turbinicarpus pseudopectinatus
Turbinicarpus viereckii
Weberbauerocereus albus
Weberbauerocereus churinensis
Weberbauerocereus cuzcoensis
Weberbauerocereus rauhii
Weberbauerocereus weberbaueri
Weberbauerocereus winterianus
Weberocereus glaber
Weberocereus tunilla
Yungasocereus inquisivensis

Aizoaceae

Amphibolia obscura
Antimima argentea
Antimima aurasensis
Antimima buchubergensis
Antimima modesta
Antimima quartzitica
Astridia hallii
Brownanthus namibensis, syn. of Mesembryanthemum namibense
Brownanthus pubescens
Cephalophyllum compressum
Cephalophyllum confusum
Delosperma klinghardtianum
Juttadinteria deserticola
Juttadinteria simpsonii
Juttadinteria suavissima
Lithops fulviceps
Lithops ruschiorum
Lithops vallis-mariae
Psammophora nissenii
Psammophora saxicola
Ruschia namusmontana
Sesuvium edmondstonii

Molluginaceae

Species

Corrigiola litoralis, strapwort
Corrigiola telephiifolia
Mollugo flavescens
Suessenguthiella caespitosa

Subspecies
Mollugo flavescens subsp. gracillima

Fagales
There are 143 species, five subspecies, and one variety in the order Fagales assessed as least concern.

Nothofagaceae
Nothofagus dombeyi, coigue

Fagaceae

Quercus agrifolia, coast live oak
Quercus alba, white oak
Quercus albocinta
Quercus arizonica, Arizona white oak
Quercus berberidifolia, California scrub oak
Quercus bicolor, swamp white oak
Quercus buckleyi, Buckley oak
Quercus castanea
Quercus chapmanii, Chapman oak
Quercus chihuahuensis
Quercus chrysolepis, canyon oak
Quercus coccinea, scarlet oak
Quercus convallata
Quercus conzattii
Quercus cornelius-mulleri, Muller oak
Quercus crassifolia, leather leaf Mexican oak
Quercus dentata
Quercus depressa
Quercus douglasii, blue oak
Quercus durata, leather oak
Quercus ellipsoidalis, Hill's oak
Quercus emoryi, Emory oak
Quercus falcata, southern red oak
Quercus fulva
Quercus gambelii, Gambel oak
Quercus garryana, Oregon white oak
Quercus geminata, sand live oak
Quercus gravesii, Chisos red oak
Quercus hemisphaerica, Darlington oak
Quercus hypoleucoides, silverleaf oak
Quercus ilicifolia, bear oak
Quercus imbricaria, shingle oak
Quercus incana, bluejack oak
Quercus inopina, sandhill oak
Quercus kelloggii, California black oak
Quercus laceyi, lacey oak
Quercus laevis, turkey oak
Quercus laurifolia, swamp laurel oak
Quercus liebmannii
Quercus lyrata, overcup oak
Quercus macrocarpa, bur oak
Quercus margarettae, sand post oak
Quercus marilandica, blackjack oak
Quercus martinezii
Quercus michauxii, swamp chestnut oak
Quercus minima, dwarf live oak
Quercus mohriana, Mohr oak
Quercus montana, chestnut oak
Quercus muehlenbergii, chinkapin oak
Quercus myrtifolia, myrtle oak
Quercus nigra, water oak
Quercus oblongifolia, Mexican blue oak
Quercus pagoda, cherrybark oak
Quercus palustris, pin oak
Quercus phellos, willow oak
Quercus planipocula
Quercus praeco
Quercus prinoides, dwarf chinquapin oak
Quercus pumila, runner oak
Quercus pungens, sandpaper oak
Quercus robur, English oak
Quercus rubra, northern red oak
Quercus sebifera
Quercus shumardii, Shumard oak
Quercus similis, swamp post oak
Quercus sinuata, bastard oak
Quercus sinuata var. breviloba, Bigelow oak
Quercus sinuata var. sinuata, Durand oak
Quercus stellata, post oak
Quercus texana, nuttall oak
Quercus toumeyi, Toumey oak
Quercus turbinella, Sonoran scrub oak
Quercus vacciniifolia, huckleberry oak
Quercus velutina, black oak
Quercus virginiana, southern live oak

Betulaceae

Species

Alnus acuminata, alder
Alnus alnobetula, green alder
Alnus cordata, Italian alder
Alnus cremastogyne
Alnus ferdinandi-coburgii
Alnus formosana
Alnus glutinosa, black alder
Alnus hirsuta, Manchurian alder
Alnus incana, grey alder
Alnus japonica, Japanese alder
Alnus jorullensis, Mount Jorullo alder
Alnus mandshurica
Alnus nepalensis, Nepal black cedar
Alnus nitida
Alnus oblongifolia, Arizona alder
Alnus pendula
Alnus rhombifolia, white alder
Alnus rubra, red alder
Alnus serrulata, hazel alder
Alnus trabeculosa
Betula alleghaniensis, yellow birch
Betula alnoides, Indian birch
Betula ashburneri
Betula chinensis, China birch
Betula cordifolia, mountain white birch
Betula costata
Betula cylindrostachya
Betula dahurica, Asian black birch
Betula ermanii, stone birch
Betula fruticosa, Japanese bog birch
Betula glandulosa, resin birch
Betula gmelinii
Betula grossa, Japanese cherry birch
Betula humilis, shrubby birch
Betula lenta, sweet birch
Betula maximowicziana, monarch birch
Betula michauxii, Newfoundland dwarf birch
Betula microphylla
Betula nana, Arctic dwarf birch
Betula nigra
Betula occidentalis, western birch
Betula papyrifera, paper birch
Betula pendula, weeping birch
Betula populifolia, wire birch
Betula pubescens, downy birch
Betula raddeana, Radde's birch
Betula utilis
Carpinus betulus, common hornbeam
Carpinus caroliniana, American hornbeam
Carpinus cordata, Sawa hornbeam
Carpinus londoniana
Carpinus orientalis, Oriental hornbeam
Carpinus polyneura
Carpinus rankanensis
Carpinus tropicalis
Carpinus tschonoskii, Asian hornbeam
Carpinus turczaninowii, Turczaninow's hornbeam
Carpinus viminea
Corylus americana, American hazel
Corylus avellana, hazel
Corylus colurna, Turkish hazel
Corylus cornuta, beaked hazel
Corylus maxima, filbert
Corylus yunnanensis, Yunnan hazel
Ostrya carpinifolia, European hop-hornbeam
Ostrya japonica
Ostrya knowltonii, Knowlton's hop-hornbeam
Ostrya virginiana, eastern hop hornbeam
Ostryopsis davidiana

Subspecies

Alnus glutinosa subsp. betuloides
Betula pendula subsp. pendula, European silver birch
Carpinus orientalis subsp. orientalis
Ostrya virginiana subsp. guatemalensis
Ostrya virginiana subsp. virginiana, American hop-hornbeam

Varieties
Betula dahurica var. dahurica

Callitrichales

Callitriche brutia, pedunculate water-starwort
Callitriche christensenii
Callitriche cophocarpa
Callitriche hermaphroditica, autumnal water-starwort
Callitriche heterophylla, two-headed water-starwort
Callitriche lenisulca
Callitriche marginata
Callitriche palustris, narrow-fruited water-starwort
Callitriche platycarpa, various-leaved water-starwort
Callitriche stagnalis, common water-starwort
Callitriche terrestris, terrestrial water-starwort
Callitriche truncata
Hippuris lanceolata
Hippuris tetraphylla
Hippuris vulgaris

Salicales

Populus heterophylla
Populus nigra, black poplar
Salix acmophylla
Salix alba, white willow
Salix amplexicaulis
Salix athabascensis
Salix bebbiana
Salix canariensis
Salix candida
Salix cinerea
Salix commutata
Salix daphnoides, European violet-willow
Salix eriocephala
Salix excelsa
Salix farriae
Salix lanata
Salix lutea
Salix melanopsis
Salix monticola
Salix myrtillifolia
Salix pedicellaris
Salix pedicellata
Salix petiolaris
Salix planifolia
Salix prolixa
Salix pyrifolia
Salix sericea
Salix serissima

Haloragales

Haloragaceae

Myriophyllum alterniflorum, alternate water-milfoil
Myriophyllum farwellii
Myriophyllum heterophyllum
Myriophyllum hippuroides
Myriophyllum humile
Myriophyllum indicum
Myriophyllum oliganthum
Myriophyllum pinnatum
Myriophyllum quitense
Myriophyllum sibiricum
Myriophyllum spicatum, spiked water-milfoil
Myriophyllum tenellum
Myriophyllum tuberculatum
Myriophyllum ussuriense
Myriophyllum verticillatum, whorled leaf water milfoil
Proserpinaca intermedia
Proserpinaca palustris
Proserpinaca pectinata

Nymphaeales

Barclaya longifolia, orchid lily
Brasenia schreberi, water-shield
Ceratophyllum demersum, rigid hornwort
Ceratophyllum muricatum
Ceratophyllum submersum, soft hornwort
Euryale ferox, gorgon
Nelumbo lutea
Nuphar lutea, yellow water-lily
Nuphar pumila, least water-lily
Nymphaea alba, European white waterlily
Nymphaea leibergii
Nymphaea micrantha, blue Egyptian lotus
Nymphaea nouchali, blue lotus
Nymphaea odorata
Nymphaea pubescens, hairy water lily
Nymphaea rubra
Nymphaea tetragona

Other dicotyledons

Species

Aristolochia paucinervis
Elaeagnus commutata
Engelhardtia rigida
Engelhardtia serrata
Engelhardtia spicata
Erythroxylum sechellarum
Euptelea pleiosperma
Leucadendron nobile
Liquidambar styraciflua, sweet gum
Myrica faya
Myrica gale
Platanus orientalis, Oriental plane-tree
Pterocarya pterocarpa
Rhodoleia championii

Varieties
Allantospermum borneense var. borneense

Monocotyledons
There are 1983 species, eight subspecies, and seven varieties of monocotyledon assessed as least concern.

Arecales

Species

Aiphanes hirsuta
Aiphanes linearis
Aiphanes ulei
Areca macrocalyx
Asterogyne ramosa
Astrocaryum aculeatissimum
Astrocaryum urostachys
Attalea funifera, piassava palm
Attalea oleifera
Bactris constanciae
Bactris fissifrons
Bactris glaucescens
Bactris turbinocarpa
Balaka longirostris
Balaka seemannii
Bismarckia nobilis
Brahea armata
Brahea brandegeei
Brahea calcarea
Brahea decumbens
Brahea dulcis
Brahea moorei
Calamus caryotoides, fishtail lawyer cane
Calamus heteracanthus
Calamus modestus
Calamus oxleyanus
Calamus pogonacanthus
Calamus salicifolius
Calamus semoi
Calamus siamensis
Calamus tenuis
Calamus usitatus
Caryota no
Caryota urens, fishtail palm
Chamaedorea alternans
Chamaedorea carchensis
Chamaedorea cataractarum, cascade palm
Chamaedorea elatior
Chamaedorea ibarrae
Chamaedorea keelerorum
Chamaedorea liebmannii
Chamaedorea microspadix
Chamaedorea nubium
Chamaedorea pinnatifrons
Chamaedorea pochutlensis
Clinostigma exorrhizum
Coccothrinax gundlachii
Copernicia baileyana
Copernicia rigida
Copernicia tectorum
Corypha utan
Cyrtostachys glauca
Dypsis baronii
Dypsis catatiana
Dypsis coursii
Dypsis fibrosa
Dypsis forficifolia
Dypsis lastelliana
Dypsis madagascariensis
Dypsis nodifera
Dypsis pachyramea
Dypsis pinnatifrons
Dypsis spicata
Eremospatha hookeri
Geonoma baculifera
Iriartea deltoidea
Itaya amicorum
Licuala malajana
Licuala telifera
Livistona lorophylla
Marojejya insignis
Metroxylon warburgii
Nephrosperma vanhoutteanum
Nypa fruticans, nypa palm
Orania longisquama
Phoenicophorium borsigianum, thief palm
Pholidocarpus majadum
Pinanga patula
Pinanga sylvestris
Plectocomia himalayana
Plectocomiopsis triquetra
Ptychococcus paradoxus
Ptychosperma microcarpum
Raphia mambillensis
Ravenea madagascariensis
Ravenea sambiranensis
Syagrus picrophylla
Syagrus pseudococos
Syagrus ruschiana
Syagrus smithii
Veitchia joannis, Joannis palm
Veitchia macdanielsii
Veitchia vitiensis
Wallichia triandra
Wettinia anomala
Wettinia disticha
Wettinia drudei
Wettinia fascicularis
Wettinia kalbreyeri

Varieties
Prestoea pubens var. pubens

Orchidales
There are 261 species in Orchidales assessed as least concern.

Orchidaceae

Acianthera chrysantha
Acianthera hondurensis
Acianthera saundersiana
Acianthera scalpricaulis
Acianthera violacea
Aeranthes ecalcarata
Agrostophyllum cyathiforme
Anacamptis palustris
Anathallis minutalis, insignificant pleurothallis
Ancistrorhynchus parviflorus
Angraecum aporoides
Angraecum bancoense
Angraecum compactum
Angraecum distichum
Angraecum gabonense
Angraecum podochiloides
Angraecum subulatum
Appendicula calcarata
Appendicula longirostrata
Barkeria naevosa, veined barkeria
Basiphyllaea corallicola, Carter's orchid
Bletia ensifolia
Brachionidium phalangiferum
Brassia verrucosa, warty brassia
Bromheadia finlaysoniana
Bryobium eriaeoides
Bulbophyllum baronii
Bulbophyllum betchei
Bulbophyllum bicoloratum
Bulbophyllum cauliflorum
Bulbophyllum delitescens, straight twist orchid
Bulbophyllum encephalodes
Bulbophyllum erinaceum
Bulbophyllum fritillariiflorum
Bulbophyllum ischnopus
Bulbophyllum leopardinum, leopard spotted bulbophyllum
Bulbophyllum lizae
Bulbophyllum macranthum
Bulbophyllum minutissimum, red bead orchid
Bulbophyllum multiflorum
Bulbophyllum radicans, stripped pyjama orchid
Bulbophyllum regnellii
Bulbophyllum renkinianum
Bulbophyllum restrepia
Caladenia brownii, kari spider orchid
Caladenia catenata, white caladenia
Caladenia citrina, Margaret River spider orchid
Caladenia cracens, neat caps
Caladenia dimorpha, spicy caps
Caladenia incensa, glistening spider orchid
Caladenia mesocera, narrow-lipped dragon orchid
Caladenia radialis, drooping spider orchid
Caladenia radiata, ray spider orchid
Caladenia splendens, splendid spider orchid
Calanthe madagascariensis
Calopogon multiflorus, many-flowered grass-pink orchid
Campylocentrum tyrridion
Catasetum barbatum, bearded catasetum
Chamorchis alpina, alpine chamorchis
Cheirostylis orobanchoides
Claderia viridiflora
Cleistes ionoglossa
Coelogyne foerstermannii
Coelogyne rigida, rigid coelogyne
Conchidium pusillum, small eria
Corybas gastrosiphon
Corycium flanaganii
Cyclopogon longibracteatus, long bracted cyclopogon
Cymbidiella falcigera
Cymbidium tracyanum
Cynorkis gibbosa
Cynorkis gigas
Cynorkis lindleyana
Cynorkis peyrotii
Cynorkis pleistadenia
Cypripedium acaule, mocassin flower
Cypripedium calceolus, lady's slipper orchid
Cypripedium guttatum, pink lady slipper
Cypripedium macranthos
Cypripedium parviflorum, American yellow lady's-slipper
Cypripedium reginae, showy lady's slipper
Cypripedium tibeticum, Tibetan cypripedium
Cyrtochilum halteratum
Cyrtopodium brandonianum
Dactylorhiza cordigera, heart shaped lip dactylorhiza
Dactylorhiza elata, stately dactylorhiza
Dactylorhiza foliosa, richly-leaved dactylorhiza
Dactylorhiza lapponica, Lapland marsh orchid
Dactylorhiza sambucina, elder-flowered orchid
Dendrobium aloifolium, aloe-like dendrobium
Dendrobium aphyllum
Dendrobium bensoniae
Dendrobium incurvum
Dendrobium lancifolium
Dendrobium lewisiae
Dendrobium litorale, coastal dendrobium
Dendrobium melinanthum
Dendrobium poneroides
Diaphananthe meliantha
Didymoplexis africana
Disa bodkinii
Disa erubescens, rose disa
Disa katangensis
Disa nyikensis
Disa thodei
Disa walleri
Disperis elaphoceras
Elleanthus oliganthus, sparse blooming elleanthus
Encyclia phoenicea, Phoenician encyclia
Encyclia spatella
Epidendrum criniferum, bract carrying epidendrum
Epidendrum geminiflorum
Epidendrum gentryi
Epidendrum microphyllum
Epidendrum oerstedii
Epidendrum proligerum
Epipactis albensis
Epipactis leptochila, narrow-lipped helleborine
Epipactis muelleri, Mueller's epipactis
Epipactis palustris, marsh helleborine
Epipactis phyllanthes, green-flowered helleborine
Epipactis purpurata, violet helleborine
Epipactis veratrifolia, eastern marsh helleborine
Erythrodes blumei
Erythrorchis altissima
Eulophia katangensis
Eulophia ramosa
Eulophia reticulata
Eulophia speciosa
Eurycentrum atroviride
Eurycentrum obscurum
Galeottia fimbriata
Geodorum recurvum
Glomera oligantha
Gomesa sessilis
Gymnadenia frivaldii, Frivald's gymnadenia
Gymnadenia odoratissima, short spurred fragrant orchid
Gymnadenia rhellicani
Habenaria armatissima
Habenaria dusenii
Habenaria glazioviana
Habenaria monorrhiza
Habenaria parviflora, small flowered habenaria
Habenaria pleiophylla
Habenaria retroflexa
Habenaria socotrana
Habenaria supplicans
Habenaria tridactylites
Habenaria virens
Helonoma bifida
Hetaeria heterosepala
Himantoglossum adriaticum
Holothrix filicornis
Huntleya burtii
Inti chartacifolia
Leochilus leochilinus
Lepanthes lindleyana
Lepanthes mucronata
Ligeophila stigmatoptera, winged stigma liogeophila
Liparis petelotii
Liparis swenssonii, northern tom cat
Lueddemannia pescatorei
Macradenia paraensis
Malaxis brachystachys, Madrean adder's mouth
Malaxis javesiae
Masdevallia strumifera, goiter carrying masdevallia
Maxillaria angustisegmenta, narrow segmented maxillaria
Mormolyca acutifolia, rufous tiger orchid
Mormolyca hedwigiae
Neottia nidus-avis, bird's-nest orchid
Octomeria taracuana
Oeceoclades maculata, ground orchid
Oeonia brauniana
Oncidium ensatum
Oncidium lancifolium
Oncidium tenuifolium
Ophrys bertolonii, Bertoloni's ophrys
Ophrys insectifera, fly orchid
Orchis brancifortii, Branciforti's orchid
Orleanesia amazonica
Ornithidium nubigenum
Palmorchis imuyaensis
Palmorchis trilobulata
Pedilochilus papuanus
Pelexia orthosepala
Phaius corymbioides
Pholidota camelostalix
Pholidota globosa
Phragmipedium boissierianum, Boissier's phragmipedium
Phragmipedium lindenii
Phragmipedium longifolium, long-leaf phragmipedium
Phragmipedium pearcei, Pearce's phragmipedium
Phragmipedium vittatum, striped phragmipedium
Phreatia constricta
Phreatia plantaginifolia
Pinalia fitzalanii, common fuzz orchid
Pinalia szetschuanica
Platanthera leucophaea, eastern prairie white-fringed orchid
Platanthera tipuloides, Aleutian bog orchid
Platycoryne mediocris
Platystele minimiflora
Pleurothallis carinifera, keeled pleurothallis
Pleurothallis rowleei
Plocoglottis borneensis
Plocoglottis copelandii
Podochilus khasianus
Polystachya albescens
Polystachya caespitifica
Polystachya modesta
Pomatocalpa maculosum
Prasophyllum giganteum, bronze leek orchid
Prasophyllum mimulum, highland leek orchid
Pteroceras simondianum
Pterostylis acuminata, pointed greenhood
Pterostylis erecta, upright maroonhood
Pterostylis hispidula, small nodding greenhood
Pterostylis mutica, midget greenhood
Pterostylis praetermissa, Mount Kaputar rusty hood
Pterostylis squamata, ruddy greenhood
Restrepia trichoglossa, hairy tongued restrepia
Sarcochilus falcatus, orange blossom orchid
Sauroglossum nitidum
Scaphyglottis sickii, Sicks scaphyglottis
Skeptrostachys arechavaletanii
Sobralia stenophylla, thin leafed sobralia
Specklinia brighamii
Specklinia corniculata, small horned pleurothalis
Specklinia picta
Spiranthes casei, Case's ladies'-tresses
Spiranthes diluvialis, Ute lady's tresses
Spiranthes sinensis, Chinese spiranthes
Spiranthes torta
Stelis immersa, sunken pleurothallis
Stelis magdalenae
Stelis ruprechtiana
Stelis tenuilabris
Taeniophyllum gracillimum
Tainia hongkongensis, purple bulb orchid
Thelymitra cyanea, blue sun-orchid
Thelymitra papuana
Tolumnia guibertiana
Tolumnia variegata, variegated oncidium
Trichoglottis smithii
Trichoglottis winkleri
Trichopilia marginata, rimmed trichopilia
Trichopilia turialbae
Tridactyle flabellata
Tridactyle phaeocephala
Tropidia saprophytica
Vanda hindsii, Cape York wanda
Vanda tessellata, grey orchid
Vanilla phalaenopsis
Zeuxine amboinensis
Zeuxine strateumatica
Zygopetalum crinitum

Burmanniaceae

Burmannia coelestis
Burmannia disticha
Burmannia grandiflora
Burmannia pusilla
Gymnosiphon cymosus
Gymnosiphon suaveolens

Cyclanthales

Asplundia euryspatha
Asplundia helicotricha
Asplundia peruviana
Carludovica palmata, Panama hat plant

Pandanales

Freycinetia bicolor
Freycinetia tenella
Pandanus kirkii
Pandanus odorifer
Pandanus temehaniensis

Bromeliales

Species

Aechmea abbreviata
Billbergia viridiflora
Brewcaria hohenbergioides
Brocchinia gilmartiniae
Dyckia lagoensis
Dyckia saxatilis
Encholirium spectabile
Greigia van-hyningii
Guzmania asplundii
Guzmania calamifolia
Guzmania calothyrsus
Guzmania jaramilloi
Guzmania macropoda
Guzmania remyi
Guzmania sibundoyorum
Neoregelia bahiana
Neoregelia laevis
Pitcairnia arcuata
Pitcairnia fusca
Pitcairnia macranthera
Pitcairnia moritziana
Pitcairnia nigra
Puya aequatorialis
Puya eryngioides
Puya glomerifera
Puya maculata
Puya retrorsa
Ronnbergia columbiana
Tillandsia andrieuxii
Tillandsia brachycaulos
Tillandsia capitata
Tillandsia chaetophylla
Tillandsia cornuta
Tillandsia fasciculata, cardinal air plant
Tillandsia foliosa
Tillandsia geminiflora
Tillandsia insignis
Tillandsia insularis, Galapagos tillandsia
Tillandsia ionantha, blushing bride
Tillandsia latifolia
Tillandsia limbata
Tillandsia macrodactylon
Tillandsia michelii
Tillandsia reichenbachii
Tillandsia rhomboidea
Vriesea bituminosa
Vriesea heliconioides

Varieties
Tillandsia fasciculata var. clavispica, clubspike cardinal airplant

Liliales
There are 225 species and five subspecies in the order Liliales assessed as least concern.

Colchicaceae

Colchicum arenarium, sand saffron
Colchicum autumnale, meadow saffron
Colchicum balansae
Gloriosa superba, flame lily
Iphigenia socotrana

Iridaceae

Babiana longicollis
Babiana scabrifolia
Babiana sinuata
Babiana socotrana
Babiana striata
Calydorea crocoides
Dierama latifolium
Freesia corymbosa, common freesia
Geissorhiza schinzii
Gladiolus italicus, common sword lily
Gladiolus oppositiflorus
Gladiolus patersoniae
Gladiolus rupicola
Iris brevicaulis
Iris histrio
Iris missouriensis
Iris palaestina
Iris prismatica
Iris pseudacorus, yellow iris
Iris spuria, blue iris
Iris versicolor
Iris virginica
Mastigostyla shepardiae
Moraea garipensis
Moraea graniticola
Moraea hexaglottis
Moraea huttonii
Moraea iringensis

Aloaceae

Species

Aloe argenticauda
Aloe breviscapa
Aloe calidophila
Aloe camperi
Aloe citrina
Aloe clarkei
Aloe corallina
Aloe debrana
Aloe dewinteri
Aloe dinteri
Aloe diolii
Aloe djiboutiensis
Aloe elegans
Aloe elegantissima
Aloe elkerriana
Aloe ellenbeckii
Aloe ericahenriettae
Aloe eumassawana
Aloe gilbertii
Aloe glabrescens
Aloe heybensis
Aloe kahinii
Aloe labworana
Aloe lateritia
Aloe leedalii
Aloe macleayi
Aloe macrocarpa
Aloe mcloughlinii
Aloe megalacantha
Aloe microdonta
Aloe miskatana
Aloe mubendiensis
Aloe namibensis
Aloe otallensis
Aloe parvidens
Aloe pirottae
Aloe rabaiensis
Aloe rigens
Aloe rivae
Aloe ruspoliana
Aloe schweinfurthii
Aloe secundiflora
Aloe sladeniana
Aloe trichosantha
Aloe trigonantha
Aloe tweedieae
Aloe viridiflora
Aloe vituensis
Aloe volkensii
Aloe wrefordii
Aloe zebrina

Subspecies
Aloe gilbertii subsp. gilbertii
Aloe megalacantha subsp. megalacantha

Amaryllidaceae

Species

Acis autumnalis, autumn snowflake
Crinum balfourii
Crinum crassicaule
Crinum firmifolium
Crinum lorifolium
Crinum paludosum
Crinum politifolium
Crinum variabile
Crinum viviparum, river crinum lily
Cyrtanthus sanguineus
Galanthus plicatus
Gethyllis britteniana
Haemanthus avasmontanus
Leucojum aestivum, summer snowflake
Leucojum vernum, spring snowflake
Narcissus assoanus
Narcissus asturiensis
Narcissus calcicola
Narcissus cyclamineus
Narcissus poeticus, pheasant's-eye narcissus
Narcissus scaberulus
Narcissus triandrus
Strumaria barbarae
Strumaria hardyana
Strumaria phonolithica

Subspecies
Narcissus pseudonarcissus subsp. nobilis

Liliaceae

Calochortus pringlei
Calochortus purpureus
Gagea afghanica
Gagea algeriensis, Algerian gagea
Gagea amblyopetala, blunt-flowered gagea
Gagea chomutovae
Gagea cossoniana, Wilczek's gagea
Gagea durieui
Gagea foliosa, leafy gagea
Gagea graeca
Gagea granatellii, Granatelli's gagea
Gagea kunawurensis
Gagea lacaitae, Lacaita's gagea
Gagea libanotica
Gagea lojaconoi
Gagea neopopovii
Gagea nevadensis
Gagea peruzzii, Peruzzi's gagea
Gagea ramulosa, branched gagea
Gagea reverchonii, Reverchon's gagea
Gagea rigida, stiff gagea
Gagea subtrigona
Gagea tisoniana
Lilium pomponium
Lloydia triflora

Hyacinthaceae

Species

Dipcadi guichardii
Drimia undata
Drimia uniflora, fairy bell
Lachenalia klinghardtiana
Lachenalia namibiensis
Lachenalia nordenstamii
Lachenalia nutans
Ledebouria grandifolia
Ornithogalum broteroi
Rhadamanthus namibensis
Rhadamanthus secundus
Scilla madeirensis
Whiteheadia etesionamibensis

Subspecies
Bellevalia dubia subsp. hackelii

Asphodelaceae

Asphodelus aestivus
Asphodelus fistulosus, onionweed
Bulbine caput-medusae
Bulbine favosa
Bulbine francescae
Bulbine namaensis

Alliaceae

Allium acutiflorum
Allium autumnale
Allium chinense
Allium colchicifolium
Allium fasciculatum
Allium geyeri
Allium grosii
Allium melanantherum
Allium moly, lily leek
Allium mongolicum
Allium rouyi
Allium rubrovittatum
Allium stearnii
Allium suaveolens
Allium tardans
Allium willeanum
Brodiaea minor, dwarf brodiaea

Dioscoreaceae

Dioscorea bernoulliana
Dioscorea lanata
Dioscorea longituba
Dioscorea ovinala
Dioscorea pseudomacrocapsa
Dioscorea quartiniana
Dioscorea sericea
Dioscorea stipulosa
Dioscorea tenuifolia
Dioscorea trilinguis
Dioscorea wallichii

Anthericaceae

Chlorophytum cameronii
Chlorophytum filipendulum
Chlorophytum graptophyllum
Chlorophytum holstii
Chlorophytum hysteranthum
Chlorophytum limosum
Chlorophytum recurvifolium
Chlorophytum ruahense
Chlorophytum subpetiolatum
Chlorophytum tuberosum
Chlorophytum viscosum
Echeandia flavescens, Torrey's craglily
Echeandia parviflora

Eriospermaceae

Eriospermum andongense
Eriospermum buchubergense
Eriospermum citrinum
Eriospermum flexum
Eriospermum lavranosii
Eriospermum mackenii

Pontederiaceae

Heteranthera callifolia, mud plantain
Heteranthera dubia
Monochoria africana
Monochoria brevipetiolata
Monochoria cyanea
Monochoria hastata, leaf pondweed
Monochoria korsakowii
Monochoria vaginalis, pickerel weed

Other Liliales

Species

Agave lechuguilla, lecheguilla agave
Aletris glabra
Asparagus aethiopicus
Asparagus faulknerae
Asparagus umbellatus
Bomarea superba
Curculigo seychellensis
Disporum calcaratum
Dracaena afromontana
Dracaena camerooniana
Dracaena cerasifera
Hanguana malayana
Kabuyea hostifolia
Lachnanthes caroliniana
Spiloxene aquatica
Tacca leontopetaloides, arrowroot
Veratrum mengtzeanum

Subspecies
Veratrum mengtzeanum subsp. mengtzeanum

Arales
There are 103 species and one subspecies in Arales assessed as least concern.

Araceae

Species

Aglaonema simplex
Alocasia flabellifera
Alocasia fornicata
Alocasia odora
Ambrosina bassii
Amorphophallus paeoniifolius
Amydrium hainanense
Amydrium sinense
Anchomanes abbreviatus
Anthurium alatipedunculatum
Anthurium bonplandii
Anthurium cordiforme
Anthurium crenatum, scalloped laceleaf
Anthurium debilis
Anthurium fasciale
Anthurium gehrigeri
Anthurium lhotzkyanum
Anthurium lingua
Anthurium ochreatum
Anthurium palenquense
Anthurium pallidiflorum
Anthurium promininerve
Anthurium rigidifolium
Anthurium rugulosum
Anthurium sagittatum
Anthurium scabrinerve
Anthurium sinuatum
Anthurium sodiroanum
Anthurium tremulum
Anthurium umbricola
Anubias barteri
Anubias gilletii
Anubias hastifolia
Anubias heterophylla
Aridarum purseglovei
Arisaema heterophyllum, dancing crane cobra lily
Arisaema jacquemontii, Jacquemont's cobra-lily
Arisaema victoriae
Arisaema yunnanense
Calla palustris, bog arum
Cercestis camerunensis
Cercestis congensis
Cercestis kamerunianus
Colocasia esculenta, wild taro
Colocasia fallax
Cryptocoryne albida
Cryptocoryne ciliata, wtare trumpet{{Clarify|date=February 2017|reason=Should this be 'water'? EoL and Red List have 'wtare' but others say 'water'.
Cryptocoryne cordata
Cryptocoryne crispatula
Cryptocoryne retrospiralis
Culcasia dinklagei
Culcasia falcifolia
Culcasia glandulosa
Culcasia lanceolata
Culcasia panduriformis
Culcasia sapinii
Culcasia scandens
Culcasia striolata
Culcasia tenuifolia
Dracunculus vulgaris, dragon lily
Gonatopus clavatus
Homalomena lauterbachii
Lagenandra ovata, Malayan sword
Lagenandra toxicaria
Lasia spinosa
Lasimorpha senegalensis, swamp arum
Lysichiton americanus
Nephthytis poissonii
Peltandra virginica
Philodendron grandipes
Philodendron guianense
Philodendron hastatum
Pistia stratiotes, water lettuce
Pycnospatha arietina
Sauromatum venosum, voodoo lily
Scindapsus hederaceus
Stylochaeton salaamicus
Stylochaeton shabaensis
Symplocarpus foetidus
Typhonium flagelliforme
Xanthosoma hylaeae
Zantedeschia aethiopica
Zantedeschia albomaculata

Subspecies
Zantedeschia albomaculata subsp. macrocarpa

Lemnaceae

Landoltia punctata, dotted duckweed
Lemna aequinoctialis, lesser duckweed
Lemna gibba, fat duckweed
Lemna minor, common duckweed
Lemna minuta
Lemna perpusilla
Lemna tenera
Lemna trisulca, duckweed
Lemna turionifera
Spirodela polyrhiza, greater duckweed
Wolffia angusta
Wolffia arrhiza, rootless duckweed
Wolffia borealis
Wolffia brasiliensis
Wolffia columbiana
Wolffia globosa
Wolffiella denticulata
Wolffiella hyalina

Acoraceae
Acorus calamus, sweet flag
Acorus gramineus, Japanese sweet flag

Zingiberales
There are 67 species and two varieties in the order Zingiberales assessed as least concern.

Costaceae

Costus bracteatus
Costus curvibracteatus
Costus giganteus
Costus lasius
Costus lima
Costus malortieanus
Costus plicatus
Costus ricus
Costus stenophyllus
Costus villosissimus
Costus wilsonii
Costus woodsonii

Zingiberaceae

Species

Aframomum angustifolium, Guinea grains
Aframomum sulcatum
Amomum chinense
Amomum chryseum
Amomum elephantorum
Amomum glabrifolium
Amomum koenigii
Amomum longiligulare
Amomum masticatorium
Amomum microcarpum
Amomum pierreanum
Amomum plicatum
Amomum prionocarpum
Amomum pterocarpum
Amomum repoeense
Amomum rubidum
Amomum schmidtii
Amomum sp.
Amomum subcapitatum
Amomum tenellum
Amomum tomrey
Amomum uliginosum
Amomum villosum
Aulotandra trigonocarpa
Boesenbergia belalongensis
Boesenbergia rotunda, Chinese ginger
Boesenbergia xiphostachya
Caulokaempferia violacea
Curcuma ecomata
Curcuma harmandii
Curcuma inodora, hidden lily
Curcuma roscoeana, jewel of Burma
Globba adhaerens
Globba albiflora
Globba fragilis
Globba geoffrayi
Globba pendula
Globba racemosa
Globba reflexa
Globba sessiliflora
Globba siamensis
Globba substrigosa
Globba winitii
Globba xantholeuca
Hedychium elatum
Renealmia aurantifera
Zingiber cernuum
Zingiber junceum
Zingiber neotruncatum
Zingiber pellitum
Zingiber thorelii

Varieties
Amomum tomrey var. tomrey
Amomum villosum var. villosum

Other Zingiberales species

Ensete livingstonianum, wild banana
Heliconia farinosa
Monotagma dolosum
Stachyphrynium spicatum

Eriocaulales

Species

Eriocaulon achiton
Eriocaulon albocapitatum
Eriocaulon apetalum
Eriocaulon aquaticum
Eriocaulon balakrishnanii
Eriocaulon brevipedunculatum
Eriocaulon breviscapum
Eriocaulon brownianum
Eriocaulon conicum
Eriocaulon cookei
Eriocaulon cuspidatum
Eriocaulon dictyophyllum
Eriocaulon dregei
Eriocaulon duthiei
Eriocaulon elenorae
Eriocaulon eurypeplon
Eriocaulon fluviatile
Eriocaulon fysonii
Eriocaulon heterolepis, buttonhead pipewort
Eriocaulon hookerianum
Eriocaulon hydrophilum
Eriocaulon inyangense
Eriocaulon kanarense
Eriocaulon lanceolatum
Eriocaulon leptophyllum
Eriocaulon leucomelas
Eriocaulon longicuspe
Eriocaulon margaretae
Eriocaulon minimum
Eriocaulon minutum
Eriocaulon nepalense
Eriocaulon odoratum
Eriocaulon oryzetorum
Eriocaulon parviflorum
Eriocaulon peninsulare
Eriocaulon ritchieanum
Eriocaulon robustobrownianum
Eriocaulon robustum
Eriocaulon sahyadricum
Eriocaulon schimperi
Eriocaulon schlechteri
Eriocaulon schultzii
Eriocaulon sedgwickii
Eriocaulon stellulatum, starry pipewort
Eriocaulon talbotii
Eriocaulon thwaitesii
Eriocaulon truncatum, short pipe-wort
Eriocaulon wightianum
Eriocaulon xeranthemum
Paepalanthus celsus
Paepalanthus ensifolius
Paepalanthus stuebelianus
Syngonanthus lanatus
Syngonanthus peruvianus
Tonina fluviatilis

Varieties
Eriocaulon dregei var. sonderianum

Commelinales
There are 39 species in the order Commelinales assessed as least concern.

Xyridaceae

Xyris aquatica
Xyris bracteata
Xyris capensis
Xyris complanata
Xyris difformis
Xyris elliottii, Elliot's yelloweyed grass
Xyris gracilis
Xyris inaequalis
Xyris indica
Xyris intersita
Xyris lobbii
Xyris montana
Xyris natalensis
Xyris pauciflora
Xyris peteri, yelloweyed grass
Xyris wallichii

Commelinaceae

Callisia gracilis
Commelina africana
Commelina benghalensis, day flower
Commelina caroliniana
Commelina clavata, willow leaved dayflower
Commelina diffusa, climbing dayflower
Commelina erecta, white mouth dayflower
Commelina imberbis
Commelina subulata
Cyanotis arcotensis
Cyanotis axillaris
Cyanotis cristata
Cyanotis cucullata
Cyanotis fasciculata
Cyanotis papilionacea
Floscopa scandens, climbing flower cup
Murdannia esculenta
Murdannia pauciflora
Murdannia semiteres
Murdannia spirata
Murdannia vaginata
Tradescantia occidentalis
Tripogandra montana

Cyperales
There are 825 species and two varieties in Cyperales assessed as least concern.

Gramineae

Species

Acroceras zizanioides, oat grass
Aegopogon cenchroides
Agropyron michnoi, Michno's wheatgrass
Agrostis aequivalvis
Agrostis canina, velvet bent
Agrostis clavata
Agrostis dyeri
Agrostis lachnantha
Agrostis media
Agrostis nervosa
Agrostis olympica
Agrostis perennans
Agrostis petriei
Agrostis stolonifera, creeping bent grass
Agrostis subulifolia
Alopecurus aequalis, orange foxtail
Alopecurus arundinaceus, creeping foxtail
Alopecurus carolinianus, tufted foxtail
Alopecurus creticus
Alopecurus himalaicus
Alopecurus magellanicus
Alopecurus setarioides
Ammochloa palaestina
Andropogon chevalieri, beardgrass
Andropogon virginicus, broomsedge bluestem
Antinoria agrostidea
Arctophila fulva
Aristida appressa
Aristida blakei
Aristida purpurea, democrat grass
Aristida repens
Aristida subspicata, Galapagos three-awn grass
Arundinella leptochloa
Arundinella thwaitesii
Arundo donax, giant reed
Avena canariensis
Axonopus scoparius, imperial carpet grass
Axonopus senescens
Bambusa heterostachya
Beckmannia eruciformis
Beckmannia syzigachne
Bothriochloa pseudischaemum
Brachiaria eruciformis
Brachiaria longiflora
Brachiaria multiculma
Brachiaria mutica
Brachiaria praetervisa, large armgrass
Brachiaria ramosa
Brachiaria reptans, creeping panic grass
Brachiaria scalaris
Brachiaria subquadripara
Brachiaria texana, Texas signal grass
Brachypodium retusum
Bromus fasciculatus
Bromus suksdorfii, Suksdorf's brome
Calamagrostis canadensis, bluejoint reed grass
Calamagrostis chalybaea
Calamagrostis coarctata, Arctic reedgrass
Calamagrostis ecuadoriensis
Calamagrostis fibrovaginata
Calamagrostis inexpansa, northern reedgrass
Calamagrostis lapponica, Lapland reedgrass
Calamagrostis pseudophragmites
Calamagrostis setiflora
Catabrosa aquatica, whorl-grass
Cenchrus platyacanthus
Chionachne gigantea
Chionachne punctata
Chionochloa rigida, narrow leaved snow tussock
Chondrosum elatum
Chondrosum gracile
Chrysopogon polyphyllus
Chusquea bambusoides, Brazil scrambling bamboo
Chusquea circinata
Chusquea perligulata
Chusquea sulcata
Coelachne minuta
Coelachne perpusilla
Coelorachis aurita
Coleanthus subtilis
Colpodium tibeticum
Cottea pappophoroides, cotta grass
Crypsis alopecuroides
Crypsis schoenoides, swamp pricklegrass
Cymbopogon obtectus, silky heads
Cynodon transvaalensis, African Bermuda grass
Dendrocalamus giganteus
Dendrocalamus membranaceus
Desmostachya bipinnata
Digitaria balansae
Digitaria curtigluma
Digitaria curvinervis
Digitaria junghuhniana
Digitaria phaeotricha
Digitaria siderograpta, crab grass
Digitaria stenostachya
Dimeria ornithopoda
Dinebra haareri
Distichlis spicata
Echinochloa colona
Echinochloa crusgalli, echinochloa crus-galli
Echinochloa frumentacea
Echinochloa picta
Echinochloa pyramidalis, antelope grass
Echinochloa walteri
Ehrharta stipoides, meadow ricegrass
Eleusine indica
Elionurus platypus
Elymus alopex
Elymus strictus
Elymus violaceus
Elytrophorus spicatus, spike grass
Eragrostis aethiopica
Eragrostis astreptoclada
Eragrostis coarctata
Eragrostis concinna
Eragrostis condensata
Eragrostis hondurensis
Eragrostis hypnoides
Eragrostis japonica, pond lovegrass
Eragrostis orthoclada
Eragrostis pubescens
Eragrostis pusilla
Eragrostis scabriflora
Eragrostis sericata
Eragrostis silveana, Silveus' lovegrass
Eragrostis subsecunda
Eragrostis unioloides
Eremocaulon amazonicum
Eriochloa meyeriana
Eriochloa procera, spring grass
Eulalia contorta
Fargesia grossa
Festuca chimborazensis
Festuca christianii-bernardii
Festuca elmeri, coast fescue
Festuca henriquesii
Festuca olgae
Festuca parvigluma
Festuca pubiglumis
Festuca sodiroana
Festuca summilusitana
Festuca tatrae
Festuca vaginalis
Festuca varia
Garnotia courtallensis
Glyceria arundinacea
Glyceria borealis
Glyceria canadensis
Glyceria fluitans, floating sweet-grass
Glyceria grandis
Glyceria leptostachya
Glyceria maxima
Glyceria melicaria
Glyceria nemoralis
Glyceria notata, plicate sweet-grass
Glyceria obtusa
Glyceria pulchella
Glyceria septentrionalis, eastern mannagrass
Glyceria striata
Guadua weberbaueri
Helictotrichon canescens
Hemarthria altissima
Hemarthria compressa, whip grass
Homolepis aturensis
Hyperthelia edulis
Ichnanthus mayarensis
Isachne albens
Isachne angolensis
Isachne clarkei
Isachne disperma
Isachne elegans
Isachne globosa, swamp millet
Isachne pulchella
Isachne villosa
Ischaemum molle
Ischaemum muticum
Ischaemum travancorense
Iseilema macratherum, bull Flinders grass
Koeleria micrathera
Koeleria novozelandica
Lasiacis divaricata, smallcane
Leersia friesii
Leersia oryzoides, cut-grass
Leersia virginica
Leptochloa fusca
Leptochloa neesii, umbrella canegrass
Leptochloa obtusiflora
Leptochloa panicea, mucronate sprangletop
Mesosetum ferrugineum
Micraira spiciforma
Muhlenbergia arenicola
Muhlenbergia distichophylla
Muhlenbergia duthieana
Muhlenbergia glomerata
Muhlenbergia spiciformis, longawn muhly
Muhlenbergia uniflora
Muhlenbergia watsoniana
Nassella ibarrensis
Nassella nardoides
Neurachne minor
Nicoraepoa subenervis
Odontelytrum abyssinicum
Olyra standleyi
Oryza officinalis
Oryza rufipogon
Oryzidium barnardii
Panicum acuminatum
Panicum comorense
Panicum effusum, hairy panic grass
Panicum gilvum
Panicum hippothrix
Panicum lukwangulense
Panicum millegrana
Panicum mlahiense
Panicum pilgerianum
Panicum pole-evansii
Panicum pseudowoeltzkowii
Panicum repens
Panicum rigidum
Panicum scabriusculum
Panicum strigosum, roughhair witchgrass
Panicum sumatrense, barefoot panicgrass
Paratheria glaberrima
Paspalidium flavidum
Paspalidium geminatum
Paspalidium punctatum
Paspalum canarae
Paspalum clavuliferum
Paspalum conjugatum
Paspalum densum
Paspalum distichum, knotgrass
Paspalum distortum
Paspalum galapageium
Paspalum longifolium
Paspalum maculosum
Paspalum pleostachyum
Paspalum repens
Paspalum riparium
Paspalum scrobiculatum, Kodo millet
Paspalum squamulatum
Paspalum vaginatum, seashore paspalum
Pennisetum frutescens, naked fountain grass
Pennisetum macrourum
Pennisetum natalense
Pennisetum thunbergii
Pentameris aristidoides
Pentameris capensis
Pentameris tomentella
Phalaris arundinacea, reed canary-grass
Phalaris truncata
Pharus latifolius
Phippsia algida, ice grass
Phleum alpinum
Phleum montanum
Phragmites australis, common reed
Phragmites karka
Phragmites vallatorius
Phyllorachis sagittata
Pleioblastus fortunei
Pleuropogon refractus
Pleuropogon sabinei
Poa acicularifolia, limestone cushion poa
Poa angustifolia
Poa annua, annual meadow grass
Poa bolanderi, Bolander's bluegrass
Poa dimorphantha
Poa faberi
Poa hartzii
Poa hirtiglumis
Poa homomalla
Poa hothamensis, ledge grass
Poa lanigera
Poa leioclada
Poa leptocoma
Poa palustris
Poa paramoensis
Poa pilata
Poa pratensis, smooth meadow grass
Poa reflexa
Poa schimperiana
Poa szechuensis
Poecilostachys oplismenoides
Pogonatherum paniceum
Polypogon monspeliensis, annual beard-grass
Polypogon nilgiricus
Polypogon viridis, water bent
Polytrias indica, Batiki bluegrass
Psathyrostachys juncea
Pseudoraphis sordida
Pseudosorghum zollingeri
Puccinellia angustata
Puccinellia arctica, Arctic alkali grass
Puccinellia nuttalliana
Puccinellia pusilla
Reynaudia filiformis
Rytidosperma richardsonii, straw wallaby-grass
Saccharum kajkaiense
Saccharum ravennae
Saccharum spontaneum
Sacciolepis angustissima
Sacciolepis curvata
Sacciolepis cymbiandra
Sacciolepis myosuroides
Sasa cernua
Sasa hidaensis
Schizachyrium brevifolium, serillo dulce
Schizachyrium gresicola
Schizachyrium yangambiense
Schizostachyum glaucifolium
Sclerochloa woronowii
Scolochloa festucacea
Sesleria coerulans
Setaria cernua
Setaria parviflora, marsh brittlegrass
Setaria paspalidioides
Setaria setosa, West Indian bristle grass
Sorghum angustum
Sorghum interjectum
Sorghum purpureosericeum
Sorghum stipoideum
Sorghum virgatum
Spartina alterniflora, Atlantic cordgrass
Spartina gracilis
Spartina pectinata
Sporobolus coahuilensis
Sporobolus consimilis
Sporobolus discosporus
Sporobolus geminatus
Sporobolus stapfianus
Sporobolus tourneuxii
Sporobolus trichodes
Stipa austroitalica
Stipa dongicola
Stipa himalaica
Stipa kingii, King's ricegrass
Stipa lessingiana
Stipa milleana
Stipa oligostachya
Stipa scribneri, Scribner needlegrass
Thrasya thrasyoides
Torreyochloa pallida
Tragus pedunculatus
Trichoneura lindleyana
Trichopteryx dregeana
Triodia lanata, wooly spinifex
Triodia secunda, porcupine spinifex
Trisetum bifidum
Urochloa panicoides
Ventenata dubia, North African grass
Vetiveria fulvibarbis
Vulpia octoflora, festuca octoflora
Vulpiella stipoides
Zingeria biebersteiniana
Zingeria pisidica
Zizania aquatica
Zizania palustris

Varieties
Paspalum galapageium var. galapageium
Paspalum galapageium var. minoratum

Cyperaceae

Actinoscirpus grossus, giant bur rush
Alinula malawica
Amphiscirpus nevadensis, Nevada bulrush
Ascolepis capensis
Ascolepis elata
Ascolepis lineariglumis
Blysmus compressus, flat-sedge
Bolboschoenus glaucus, tuberous bulrush
Bolboschoenus laticarpus
Bolboschoenus maritimus
Bulbostylis boeckleriana
Bulbostylis capillaris, densetuft hairsedge
Bulbostylis densa
Bulbostylis emmerichiae
Bulbostylis hispidula
Bulbostylis igneotonsa
Bulbostylis lichtensteiniana
Bulbostylis schoenoides
Bulbostylis turbinata, hair sedge
Carex acuta, slender tufted-sedge
Carex acutiformis, lesser pond-sedge
Carex aethiopica
Carex albula, blonde sedge
Carex alopecoidea
Carex anthoxanthea, grassy-slope Arctic sedge
Carex aperta
Carex appropinquata
Carex aquatilis, aquatic sedge
Carex arapahoensis, Arapaho sedge
Carex arcta, northern clustered sedge
Carex arctiformis
Carex atherodes, wheat sedge
Carex atlantica, prickly bog sedge
Carex atrofuscoides
Carex austroafricana
Carex baccans, crimson seeded sedge
Carex bebbii, Bebb's sedge
Carex bequaertii
Carex bicolor
Carex borbonica
Carex borii
Carex brunnescens
Carex bulbostylis, false hair sedge
Carex buxbaumii, club sedge
Carex caespitosa
Carex canescens, white sedge
Carex chordorrhiza
Carex cilicica
Carex clavata
Carex cognata
Carex comosa, bristly sedge
Carex conferta
Carex conoidea, open field sedge
Carex crinita, fringed sedge
Carex cryptolepis, northeastern sedge
Carex cusickii, Cusick's sedge
Carex davalliana
Carex debilis, white-edge sedge
Carex dianae, Diana's peak grass
Carex diandra
Carex digitalis, slender woodland sedge
Carex diluta
Carex distachya
Carex distans
Carex divisa
Carex echinata, star sedge
Carex elata
Carex emoryi, Emory's sedge
Carex erythrorrhiza
Carex exilis, coastal sedge
Carex exsiccata
Carex extensa
Carex filicina
Carex fissa, hammock sedge
Carex flava, large yellow-sedge
Carex folliculata, northern long sedge
Carex gayana
Carex glareosa, lesser saltmarsh sedge
Carex granularis, granular sedge
Carex gynandra, mountain fringed sedge
Carex gynocrates, northern bog sedge
Carex haydenii, Hayden's sedge
Carex hebecarpa
Carex hebes, dry land sedge
Carex hispida
Carex holostoma, Arctic marsh sedge
Carex hyalinolepis, shoreline sedge
Carex hystericina
Carex indiciformis
Carex interior, inland sedge
Carex intumescens, greater bladder sedge
Carex japonica
Carex lachenalii, twotipped sedge
Carex lacustris, lake bank sedge
Carex laevivaginata, smoothsheath sedge
Carex lageniformis
Carex lasiocarpa
Carex lenticularis, shore sedge
Carex leptalea, bristly-stalked sedge
Carex limosa
Carex lindleyana
Carex livida, pale sedge
Carex loliacea, ryegrass sedge
Carex longipes
Carex lophocarpa
Carex louisianica, Louisiana sedge
Carex lupulina, hop sedge
Carex lurida, sallow sedge
Carex luridiformis
Carex luzulina, woodrush sedge
Carex lycurus
Carex lyngbyei, Lyngbye's sedge
Carex macrochaeta, Alaska large awn sedge
Carex macrostyla
Carex maculata
Carex magellanica
Carex malato-belizii
Carex maorica, Maori sedge
Carex marina, seashore sedge
Carex melinacra
Carex michauxiana, Miochaux's sedge
Carex microcarpa
Carex microglochin
Carex montis-everesti
Carex myosurus
Carex nebrascensis, Nebraska sedge
Carex nigerrima
Carex nigra, common sedge
Carex normalis, greater straw sedge
Carex norvegica, alpine sedge
Carex obnupta, slough sedge
Carex oederi
Carex oedipostyla
Carex oligosperma, fewseed sedge
Carex orbicularis
Carex otrubae
Carex paleacea, chaffy sedge
Carex paniculata, greater tussock-sedge
Carex panormitana
Carex parryana, Parry's sedge
Carex pauciflora, few-flowered sedge
Carex pedunculata, longstalk sedge
Carex pellita, woolly sedge
Carex phacota
Carex pluriflora, severalflower sedge
Carex prairea, prairie sedge
Carex prasina, drooping sedge
Carex pseudocyperus, cyperus sedge
Carex pseudofoetida
Carex punctata, dotted sedge
Carex rariflora, mountain bog-sedge
Carex remota
Carex retrorsa, knot-sheath sedge
Carex rigidioides
Carex riparia, greater pond-sedge
Carex rossii, Ross' sedge
Carex rostrata
Carex rotundata, round-fruited sedge
Carex sartwellii, Sartwell's sedge
Carex saxatilis, russet sedge
Carex scabrata, scabrous sedge
Carex simensis
Carex simulata, analogue sedge
Carex songorica
Carex stenophylla
Carex sterilis, sterile sedge
Carex stipata, awl-fruited sedge
Carex stricta, tussock sedge
Carex stylosa, long-styled sedge
Carex subspathacea, Hoppner's sedge
Carex tenuiflora, sparse-flowered sedge
Carex thouarsii
Carex trisperma, three-seeded sedge
Carex tuckermanii, Tuckerman's sedge
Carex umbrosa
Carex utriculata, common yellow lake sedge
Carex vaginata, sheathed sedge
Carex vesicaria
Carex vixdentata
Carex vulpina, true fox sedge
Carex vulpinoidea, brown fox sedge
Carex wiegandii, Wiegand's sedge
Carpha capitellata
Carpha glomerata
Cladium mariscoides, smooth sawgrass
Cladium mariscus, great fen-sedge
Costularia hornei
Cyathochaeta diandra, sheath rush
Cyperus alopecuroides, foxtail sedge
Cyperus alternifolius
Cyperus alulatus
Cyperus amabilis
Cyperus anderssonii, Andersson's sedge
Cyperus appendiculatus
Cyperus arenarius
Cyperus articulatus, jointed flatsedge
Cyperus aterrimus
Cyperus berroi
Cyperus camphoratus
Cyperus castaneus
Cyperus cephalotes
Cyperus clarkei
Cyperus clavinux
Cyperus compactus
Cyperus compressus, poorland flatsedge
Cyperus congensis
Cyperus cylindrostachyus
Cyperus cyperoides
Cyperus dentatus, toothed flatsedge
Cyperus difformis, smallflower umbrella sedge
Cyperus diffusus, dwarf umbrella grass
Cyperus digitatus, finger flatsegde
Cyperus dilatatus
Cyperus distans, slender cyperus
Cyperus drummondii, green flat sedge
Cyperus dubius
Cyperus elatus
Cyperus enervis
Cyperus eragrostis, tall flatsedge
Cyperus erythrorhizos, red-root flatsedge
Cyperus esculentus, yellow nutsedge
Cyperus fuscus, brown galingale
Cyperus glaber
Cyperus glaucophyllus
Cyperus glomeratus
Cyperus grandibulbosus
Cyperus grayi, Gray's flat sedge
Cyperus guianensis
Cyperus hamulosus
Cyperus imbricatus, shingle flatsegde
Cyperus iria
Cyperus kerstenii
Cyperus laevigatus, smooth flatsedge
Cyperus longus, sweet cyperus
Cyperus maderaspatanus
Cyperus meeboldii
Cyperus michelianus
Cyperus mitis
Cyperus mollipes
Cyperus nipponicus
Cyperus nutans
Cyperus pangorei
Cyperus paniceus
Cyperus papyrus, papyrus sedge
Cyperus pilosus
Cyperus plateilema
Cyperus platyphyllus
Cyperus podocarpus
Cyperus procerus
Cyperus pulchellus
Cyperus pustulatus
Cyperus reduncus
Cyperus rigidifolius
Cyperus rotundus
Cyperus rubicundus
Cyperus schimperianus, Schimper flatsedge
Cyperus sphaerospermus
Cyperus squarrosus
Cyperus stoloniferus
Cyperus strigosus, strawcolored flatsedge
Cyperus tenuiculmis
Cyperus tenuispica
Cyperus textilis
Cyperus tuberosus, purple nut sedge
Cyperus turrillii
Cyperus zollingeri, roadside flatsedge
Diplacrum caricinum
Dulichium arundinaceum, three way sedge
Eleocharis acicularis
Eleocharis argyrolepis
Eleocharis atropurpurea
Eleocharis brainii
Eleocharis caduca
Eleocharis carniolica
Eleocharis complanata
Eleocharis compressa, flat-stem spike-rush
Eleocharis congesta
Eleocharis decoriglumis
Eleocharis deightonii
Eleocharis densa
Eleocharis dregeana
Eleocharis elliptica, elliptic spikerush
Eleocharis erythropoda, bald spikerush
Eleocharis flavescens, wrinkle-sheathed spike-rush
Eleocharis geniculata, Canada spikesedge
Eleocharis intermedia, matted spikerush
Eleocharis lankana
Eleocharis macrantha
Eleocharis macrostachya, creeping spikerush
Eleocharis marginulata
Eleocharis minarum
Eleocharis mitracarpa
Eleocharis obtusa, blunt spikerush
Eleocharis ochrostachys
Eleocharis palustris, common spike-rush
Eleocharis quinqueflora, few-flowered spike-rush
Eleocharis retroflexa
Eleocharis robbinsii, Robbins' spikerush
Eleocharis rostellata, beaked spikerush
Eleocharis sellowiana
Eleocharis spiralis
Eleocharis suksdorfiana, Suksdorf's spikerush
Eleocharis uniglumis, slender spike-rush
Eriophorum angustifolium
Eriophorum callitrix, Arctic cottongrass
Eriophorum chamissonis, Chamisso's cottongrass
Eriophorum latifolium
Eriophorum tenellum, few-nerved cottongrass
Eriophorum vaginatum, sheathed cottongrass
Eriophorum virginicum, tawny cottongrass
Eriophorum viridicarinatum, green-keeled cottongrass
Ficinia capillifolia
Fimbristylis acuminata
Fimbristylis alboviridis
Fimbristylis aphylla
Fimbristylis argentea
Fimbristylis autumnalis, slender fimbry
Fimbristylis bisumbellata
Fimbristylis cinnamometorum
Fimbristylis complanata
Fimbristylis consanguinea
Fimbristylis costiglumis
Fimbristylis cymosa
Fimbristylis dichotoma
Fimbristylis dipsacea, Harper's fimbristylis
Fimbristylis ferruginea
Fimbristylis kingii
Fimbristylis lawiana
Fimbristylis littoralis, lesser fimbristylis
Fimbristylis merrillii
Fimbristylis microcarya
Fimbristylis nutans
Fimbristylis ovata
Fimbristylis polytrichoides
Fimbristylis pubisquama
Fimbristylis quinquangularis
Fimbristylis salbundia
Fimbristylis schoenoides, ditch fimbry
Fimbristylis sieberiana
Fimbristylis tetragona
Fimbristylis turkestanica
Fimbristylis variegata
Fuirena ciliaris
Fuirena coerulescens
Fuirena cuspidata
Fuirena ecklonii
Fuirena obcordata
Fuirena pubescens
Fuirena trilobites
Fuirena tuwensis
Fuirena umbellata, yefen
Fuirena uncinata
Isolepis cernua, slender club-rush
Isolepis digitata
Isolepis fluitans, floating club-rush
Isolepis natans
Isolepis prolifera
Isolepis pseudosetacea
Isolepis setacea, bristle club-rush
Kobresia simpliciuscula
Kyllinga brevifolia
Kyllinga bulbosa
Kyllinga debilis
Kyllinga melanosperma
Kyllinga microstyla
Kyllinga nemoralis, white water sedge
Kyllinga tanzaniae
Lipocarpha chinensis
Lipocarpha filiformis
Lipocarpha gracilis
Lipocarpha kernii
Lipocarpha maculata, American halfchaff sedge
Lipocarpha micrantha, small-flowered dwarf-bulrush
Mapania floribunda
Mapania longiflora
Mesomelaena pseudostygia, semaphore sedge
Oreobolus cleefii
Oreobolus kuekenthalii
Pycreus bipartitus, shining flatsedge
Pycreus cooperi
Pycreus dwarkensis
Pycreus elegantulus
Pycreus flavescens
Pycreus flavidus
Pycreus intermedius
Pycreus macranthus
Pycreus macrostachyos
Pycreus mortonii
Pycreus nuerensis
Pycreus oakfortensis
Pycreus okavangensis
Pycreus pauper
Pycreus polystachyos, bunchy flat sedge
Pycreus pumilus
Pycreus puncticulatus
Pycreus sanguinolentus
Pycreus stramineus
Pycreus xantholepis
Queenslandiella hyalina, Queensland sedge
Rhynchospora alba
Rhynchospora armerioides
Rhynchospora bakhuisensis
Rhynchospora capillacea, needle beaksedge
Rhynchospora capitellata, brownish beaksedge
Rhynchospora corymbosa
Rhynchospora fusca, brown beakrush
Rhynchospora macrostachya
Rhynchospora spectabilis
Schoenoplectiella lateriflora
Schoenoplectiella leucantha
Schoenoplectiella purshiana
Schoenoplectiella roylei
Schoenoplectiella senegalensis
Schoenoplectiella smithii
Schoenoplectiella supina
Schoenoplectus acutus, hardstem bulrush
Schoenoplectus americanus, American bulrush
Schoenoplectus corymbosus
Schoenoplectus decipiens
Schoenoplectus heterochaetus
Schoenoplectus junceus
Schoenoplectus lacustris, common club-rush
Schoenoplectus litoralis
Schoenoplectus mucronatus, bog bulrush
Schoenoplectus muricinux
Schoenoplectus muriculatus
Schoenoplectus paludicola
Schoenoplectus pulchellus
Schoenoplectus subterminalis, water bulrush
Schoenoplectus tabernaemontani, grey club-rush
Schoenoplectus torreyi, Torrey's bulrush
Schoenoplectus triqueter, triangular club-rush
Schoenus deformis, tufted bog rush
Schoenus nigricans, black bog-rush
Scirpoides holoschoenus, round-headed club-rush
Scirpus atrocinctus, black-girdled bulrush
Scirpus atrovirens, wool bulrush
Scirpus bicolor
Scirpus cyperinus
Scirpus expansus
Scirpus georgianus
Scirpus hattorianus
Scirpus longii
Scirpus microcarpus
Scirpus pallidus
Scirpus pedicellatus
Scirpus pendulus
Scirpus sylvaticus, wood club-rush
Scleria amazonica
Scleria biflora
Scleria bracteata
Scleria dregeana
Scleria foliosa
Scleria griegifolia
Scleria iostephana
Scleria mackaviensis
Scleria mikawana
Scleria reticularis, reticulated nutrush
Scleria terrestris
Scleria triglomerata, whip nutrush
Scleria verticillata
Scleria vogelii
Trichophorum alpinum
Trichophorum caespitosum
Trichophorum clintonii
Trichophorum subcapitatum
Uncinia leptostachya, bastard grass
Zameioscirpus atacamensis

Alismatales
There are 27 species in the order Alismatales assessed as least concern.

Alismataceae

Alisma lanceolatum, narrow-leaved water-plantain
Alisma plantago-aquatica, common water-plantain
Alisma subcordatum
Alisma triviale
Burnatia enneandra
Caldesia grandis
Caldesia oligococca
Caldesia parnassifolia
Damasonium bourgaei
Echinodorus emersus
Limnophyton obtusifolium
Luronium natans
Ranalisma humile
Sagittaria brevirostra
Sagittaria cristata
Sagittaria cuneata
Sagittaria graminea
Sagittaria guayanensis
Sagittaria latifolia
Sagittaria potamogetifolia
Sagittaria pygmaea
Sagittaria rigida
Sagittaria sagittifolia
Sagittaria trifolia
Wiesneria triandra

Limnocharitaceae
Butomopsis latifolia

Butomaceae
Butomus umbellatus, flowering-rush

Najadales
There are 96 species in Najadales assessed as least concern.

Zosteraceae

Phyllospadix scouleri
Phyllospadix serrulatus
Phyllospadix torreyi
Zostera japonica
Zostera marina, eelgrass
Zostera muelleri
Zostera nigricaulis
Zostera noltii, Zostera noltei
Zostera pacifica, wide-leaved eelgrass
Zostera polychlamys
Zostera tasmanica

Aponogetonaceae

Aponogeton afroviolaceus
Aponogeton crispus, crinkled aponogeton
Aponogeton desertorum
Aponogeton distachyos
Aponogeton junceus
Aponogeton lakhonensis
Aponogeton natalensis
Aponogeton natans, floating lace plant
Aponogeton nudiflorus
Aponogeton rehmannii
Aponogeton stuhlmannii
Aponogeton subconjugatus
Aponogeton undulatus
Aponogeton vallisnerioides

Posidoniaceae

Posidonia angustifolia
Posidonia coriacea
Posidonia denhartogii
Posidonia kirkmanii
Posidonia oceanica, Neptune grass
Posidonia ostenfeldii

Potamogetonaceae

Groenlandia densa, opposite-leaved pondweed
Potamogeton alpinus, red pondweed
Potamogeton amplifolius
Potamogeton berchtoldii, small pondweed
Potamogeton bicupulatus
Potamogeton coloratus, fen pondweed
Potamogeton confervoides
Potamogeton crispus, curled pondweed
Potamogeton distinctus
Potamogeton epihydrus, American pondweed
Potamogeton foliosus
Potamogeton friesii, flat-stalked pondweed
Potamogeton gramineus, various-leaved pondweed
Potamogeton hillii
Potamogeton lucens, shining pondweed
Potamogeton maackianus
Potamogeton natans, broad-leaved pondweed
Potamogeton nodosus, Loddon pondweed
Potamogeton oakesianus
Potamogeton obtusifolius, blunt-leaved pondweed
Potamogeton octandrus
Potamogeton perfoliatus, perfoliate pondweed
Potamogeton polygonifolius, bog pondweed
Potamogeton praelongus, long-stalked pondweed
Potamogeton pulcher
Potamogeton pusillus, lesser pondweed
Potamogeton richardsonii
Potamogeton robbinsii
Potamogeton schweinfurthii
Potamogeton spirillus
Potamogeton strictifolius
Potamogeton subsibiricus
Potamogeton trichoides, hairlike pondweed
Potamogeton vaseyi
Potamogeton wrightii
Ruppia cirrhosa, spiral ditchgrass
Ruppia maritima, beaked tasselweed
Ruppia megacarpa, large-fruit seatassel
Ruppia polycarpa
Ruppia tuberosa
Stuckenia amblyophyla
Stuckenia filiformis, threadleaf-pondweed
Stuckenia pectinata, fennel pondweed
Stuckenia vaginata
Zannichellia melitensis, Maltese horned pondweed
Zannichellia palustris, horned pondweed
Zannichellia peltata

Cymodoceaceae

Amphibolis antarctica
Amphibolis griffithii
Cymodocea angustata
Cymodocea nodosa, slender seagrass
Cymodocea rotundata
Cymodocea serrulata
Halodule pinifolia
Halodule uninervis
Halodule wrightii
Syringodium filiforme, manatee grass
Syringodium isoetifolium
Thalassodendron ciliatum
Thalassodendron pachyrhizum

Scheuchzeriaceae
Scheuchzeria palustris

Juncaginaceae

Triglochin bulbosa
Triglochin maritima, sea arrowgrass
Triglochin palustris, marsh arrowgrass
Triglochin scilloides

Juncales

Species

Distichia acicularis
Juncus acuminatus
Juncus acutus, spiny rush
Juncus alpinoarticulatus
Juncus anthelatus
Juncus articulatus, jointed rush
Juncus balticus
Juncus biglumis
Juncus bolanderi
Juncus brachycephalus
Juncus brevicaudatus
Juncus bufonius, toad rush
Juncus bulbosus, bulbous rush
Juncus canadensis
Juncus capensis
Juncus compressus, round-fruited rush
Juncus conglomeratus, compact rush
Juncus decipiens
Juncus dregeanus
Juncus dudleyi
Juncus effusus, soft rush
Juncus exsertus
Juncus filiformis
Juncus fontanesii
Juncus heldreichianus
Juncus hybridus
Juncus inflexus, hard rush
Juncus lomatophyllus
Juncus marginatus
Juncus mertensianus
Juncus militaris
Juncus minutulus
Juncus nodosus
Juncus oxycarpus
Juncus pelocarpus
Juncus prismatocarpus
Juncus punctorius
Juncus requienii
Juncus rigidus, sea rush
Juncus scabriusculus
Juncus socotranus
Juncus striatus
Juncus stygius
Juncus subcaudatus
Juncus subnodulosus, blunt-flowered rush
Juncus subtilis
Juncus subulatus
Juncus supiniformis
Juncus tenageia
Juncus triglumis
Juncus wallichianus
Luzula abyssinica
Luzula wahlenbergii
Prionium serratum

Subspecies
Juncus dregeanus subsp. bachitii
Juncus dregeanus subsp. dregeanus

Hydrocharitales

Blyxa aubertii, round fruit blyxa
Blyxa japonica
Blyxa octandra
Elodea bifoliata
Elodea canadensis
Elodea nuttallii
Enhalus acoroides
Halophila australis
Halophila capricorni
Halophila decipiens, paddle grass
Halophila johnsonii, Johnson's seagrass
Halophila minor
Halophila ovalis
Halophila ovata
Halophila spinulosa
Halophila stipulacea
Halophila tricostata
Hydrilla verticillata, Indian stargrass
Hydrocharis chevalieri
Hydrocharis dubia
Hydrocharis morsus-ranae, European frogbit
Lagarosiphon cordofanus
Lagarosiphon ilicifolius
Lagarosiphon major
Lagarosiphon verticillifolius
Najas flexilis
Najas gracillima
Najas graminea, ricefield waternymph
Najas guadalupensis
Najas indica
Najas malesiana
Najas marina, holly-leaved naiad
Najas minor
Najas pectinata
Najas schweinfurthii
Najas tenuifolia, thin-leaved naiad
Najas testui
Nechamandra alternifolia
Ottelia alismoides, duck-lettuce
Ottelia cordata
Ottelia fischeri
Ottelia kunenensis
Ottelia muricata
Stratiotes aloides, water-soldier
Thalassia hemprichii
Thalassia testudinum
Vallisneria americana
Vallisneria natans
Vallisneria spiralis, tapegrass

Restionales

Centrolepis glabra, smooth centrolepis
Centrolepis philippinensis
Elegia macrocarpa
Platycaulos mahonii
Restio insignis
Restio subverticillatus

Typhales

Sparganium americanum
Sparganium androcladum
Sparganium angustifolium, floating bur-reed
Sparganium emersum, unbranched bur-reed
Sparganium erectum, branched bur-reed
Sparganium eurycarpum
Sparganium fallax
Sparganium fluctuans
Sparganium glomeratum
Sparganium hyperboreum
Sparganium natans, least bur-reed
Sparganium subglobosum, floating burr-reed
Typha angustifolia, lesser bulrush
Typha capensis
Typha domingensis, southern cat-tail
Typha elephantina
Typha latifolia, broadleaf cattail
Typha laxmannii
Typha minima, dwarf bulrush
Typha orientalis, bullrush

Hydatellales
Trithuria lanterna

See also 
 Lists of IUCN Red List least concern species
 List of near threatened plants
 List of vulnerable plants
 List of endangered plants
 List of critically endangered plants
 List of recently extinct plants
 List of data deficient plants

Notes

References 

Plants
Least concern plants